The Lepidoptera of the Czech Republic consist of both the butterflies and moths recorded from the Czech Republic.

Butterflies

Hesperiidae
Carcharodus alceae (Esper, 1780)
Carterocephalus palaemon (Pallas, 1771)
Carterocephalus silvicola (Meigen, 1829)
Erynnis tages (Linnaeus, 1758)
Hesperia comma (Linnaeus, 1758)
Heteropterus morpheus (Pallas, 1771)
Ochlodes sylvanus (Esper, 1777)
Pyrgus alveus (Hübner, 1803)
Pyrgus armoricanus (Oberthür, 1910)
Pyrgus carthami (Hübner, 1813)
Pyrgus malvae (Linnaeus, 1758)
Pyrgus serratulae (Rambur, 1839)
Spialia sertorius (Hoffmannsegg, 1804)
Thymelicus acteon (Rottemburg, 1775)
Thymelicus lineola (Ochsenheimer, 1808)
Thymelicus sylvestris (Poda, 1761)

Lycaenidae
Agriades optilete (Knoch, 1781)
Aricia agestis (Denis & Schiffermüller, 1775)
Aricia artaxerxes (Fabricius, 1793)
Callophrys rubi (Linnaeus, 1758)
Celastrina argiolus (Linnaeus, 1758)
Cupido minimus (Fuessly, 1775)
Cupido alcetas (Hoffmannsegg, 1804)
Cupido argiades (Pallas, 1771)
Cupido decolorata (Staudinger, 1886)
Cyaniris semiargus (Rottemburg, 1775)
Eumedonia eumedon (Esper, 1780)
Favonius quercus (Linnaeus, 1758)
Glaucopsyche alexis (Poda, 1761)
Lycaena alciphron (Rottemburg, 1775)
Lycaena dispar (Haworth, 1802)
Lycaena helle (Denis & Schiffermüller, 1775)
Lycaena hippothoe (Linnaeus, 1761)
Lycaena phlaeas (Linnaeus, 1761)
Lycaena thersamon (Esper, 1784)
Lycaena tityrus (Poda, 1761)
Lycaena virgaureae (Linnaeus, 1758)
Lysandra bellargus (Rottemburg, 1775)
Lysandra coridon (Poda, 1761)
Phengaris alcon (Denis & Schiffermüller, 1775)
Phengaris arion (Linnaeus, 1758)
Phengaris nausithous (Bergstrasser, 1779)
Phengaris teleius (Bergstrasser, 1779)
Plebejus argus (Linnaeus, 1758)
Plebejus argyrognomon (Bergstrasser, 1779)
Plebejus idas (Linnaeus, 1761)
Polyommatus damon (Denis & Schiffermüller, 1775)
Polyommatus daphnis (Denis & Schiffermüller, 1775)
Polyommatus amandus (Schneider, 1792)
Polyommatus dorylas (Denis & Schiffermüller, 1775)
Polyommatus eros (Ochsenheimer, 1808)
Polyommatus icarus (Rottemburg, 1775)
Polyommatus thersites (Cantener, 1835)
Pseudophilotes baton (Bergstrasser, 1779)
Pseudophilotes vicrama (Moore, 1865)
Satyrium acaciae (Fabricius, 1787)
Satyrium ilicis (Esper, 1779)
Satyrium pruni (Linnaeus, 1758)
Satyrium spini (Denis & Schiffermüller, 1775)
Satyrium w-album (Knoch, 1782)
Scolitantides orion (Pallas, 1771)
Thecla betulae (Linnaeus, 1758)

Nymphalidae
Aglais io (Linnaeus, 1758)
Aglais urticae (Linnaeus, 1758)
Apatura ilia (Denis & Schiffermüller, 1775)
Apatura iris (Linnaeus, 1758)
Aphantopus hyperantus (Linnaeus, 1758)
Araschnia levana (Linnaeus, 1758)
Arethusana arethusa (Denis & Schiffermüller, 1775)
Argynnis paphia (Linnaeus, 1758)
Argynnis pandora (Denis & Schiffermüller, 1775)
Boloria aquilonaris (Stichel, 1908)
Boloria dia (Linnaeus, 1767)
Boloria euphrosyne (Linnaeus, 1758)
Boloria selene (Denis & Schiffermüller, 1775)
Boloria eunomia (Esper, 1799)
Brenthis daphne (Bergstrasser, 1780)
Brenthis hecate (Denis & Schiffermüller, 1775)
Brenthis ino (Rottemburg, 1775)
Brintesia circe (Fabricius, 1775)
Chazara briseis (Linnaeus, 1764)
Coenonympha arcania (Linnaeus, 1761)
Coenonympha glycerion (Borkhausen, 1788)
Coenonympha hero (Linnaeus, 1761)
Coenonympha pamphilus (Linnaeus, 1758)
Coenonympha tullia (Muller, 1764)
Erebia aethiops (Esper, 1777)
Erebia epiphron (Knoch, 1783)
Erebia euryale (Esper, 1805)
Erebia ligea (Linnaeus, 1758)
Erebia medusa (Denis & Schiffermüller, 1775)
Erebia sudetica Staudinger, 1861
Euphydryas aurinia (Rottemburg, 1775)
Euphydryas maturna (Linnaeus, 1758)
Fabriciana adippe (Denis & Schiffermüller, 1775)
Fabriciana niobe (Linnaeus, 1758)
Hipparchia fagi (Scopoli, 1763)
Hipparchia hermione (Linnaeus, 1764)
Hipparchia statilinus (Hufnagel, 1766)
Hipparchia semele (Linnaeus, 1758)
Hyponephele lupinus (O. Costa, 1836)
Hyponephele lycaon (Rottemburg, 1775)
Issoria lathonia (Linnaeus, 1758)
Lasiommata maera (Linnaeus, 1758)
Lasiommata megera (Linnaeus, 1767)
Lasiommata petropolitana (Fabricius, 1787)
Limenitis camilla (Linnaeus, 1764)
Limenitis populi (Linnaeus, 1758)
Limenitis reducta Staudinger, 1901
Lopinga achine (Scopoli, 1763)
Maniola jurtina (Linnaeus, 1758)
Melanargia galathea (Linnaeus, 1758)
Melitaea athalia (Rottemburg, 1775)
Melitaea aurelia Nickerl, 1850
Melitaea britomartis Assmann, 1847
Melitaea cinxia (Linnaeus, 1758)
Melitaea diamina (Lang, 1789)
Melitaea didyma (Esper, 1778)
Melitaea phoebe (Denis & Schiffermüller, 1775)
Melitaea trivia (Denis & Schiffermüller, 1775)
Minois dryas (Scopoli, 1763)
Neptis rivularis (Scopoli, 1763)
Neptis sappho (Pallas, 1771)
Nymphalis antiopa (Linnaeus, 1758)
Nymphalis polychloros (Linnaeus, 1758)
Nymphalis vaualbum (Denis & Schiffermüller, 1775)
Nymphalis xanthomelas (Esper, 1781)
Pararge aegeria (Linnaeus, 1758)
Polygonia c-album (Linnaeus, 1758)
Speyeria aglaja (Linnaeus, 1758)
Vanessa atalanta (Linnaeus, 1758)
Vanessa cardui (Linnaeus, 1758)

Papilionidae
Iphiclides podalirius (Linnaeus, 1758)
Papilio machaon Linnaeus, 1758
Parnassius apollo (Linnaeus, 1758)
Parnassius mnemosyne (Linnaeus, 1758)
Zerynthia polyxena (Denis & Schiffermüller, 1775)

Pieridae
Anthocharis cardamines (Linnaeus, 1758)
Aporia crataegi (Linnaeus, 1758)
Colias alfacariensis Ribbe, 1905
Colias chrysotheme (Esper, 1781)
Colias croceus (Fourcroy, 1785)
Colias erate (Esper, 1805)
Colias hyale (Linnaeus, 1758)
Colias myrmidone (Esper, 1781)
Colias palaeno (Linnaeus, 1761)
Gonepteryx rhamni (Linnaeus, 1758)
Leptidea morsei (Fenton, 1882)
Leptidea reali Reissinger, 1990
Leptidea sinapis (Linnaeus, 1758)
Pieris brassicae (Linnaeus, 1758)
Pieris bryoniae (Hübner, 1806)
Pieris mannii (Mayer, 1851)
Pieris napi (Linnaeus, 1758)
Pieris rapae (Linnaeus, 1758)
Pontia edusa (Fabricius, 1777)

Riodinidae
Hamearis lucina (Linnaeus, 1758)

Moths

Adelidae
Adela croesella (Scopoli, 1763)
Adela cuprella (Denis & Schiffermüller, 1775)
Adela mazzolella (Hübner, 1801)
Adela reaumurella (Linnaeus, 1758)
Adela violella (Denis & Schiffermüller, 1775)
Cauchas fibulella (Denis & Schiffermüller, 1775)
Cauchas leucocerella (Scopoli, 1763)
Cauchas rufifrontella (Treitschke, 1833)
Cauchas rufimitrella (Scopoli, 1763)
Nematopogon adansoniella (Villers, 1789)
Nematopogon metaxella (Hübner, 1813)
Nematopogon pilella (Denis & Schiffermüller, 1775)
Nematopogon robertella (Clerck, 1759)
Nematopogon schwarziellus Zeller, 1839
Nematopogon swammerdamella (Linnaeus, 1758)
Nemophora associatella (Zeller, 1839)
Nemophora congruella (Zeller, 1839)
Nemophora cupriacella (Hübner, 1819)
Nemophora degeerella (Linnaeus, 1758)
Nemophora dumerilella (Duponchel, 1839)
Nemophora fasciella (Fabricius, 1775)
Nemophora metallica (Poda, 1761)
Nemophora minimella (Denis & Schiffermüller, 1775)
Nemophora ochsenheimerella (Hübner, 1813)
Nemophora pfeifferella (Hübner, 1813)
Nemophora prodigellus (Zeller, 1853)
Nemophora raddaella (Hübner, 1793)
Nemophora violellus (Herrich-Schäffer in Stainton, 1851)

Alucitidae
Alucita desmodactyla Zeller, 1847
Alucita grammodactyla Zeller, 1841
Alucita hexadactyla Linnaeus, 1758
Alucita huebneri Wallengren, 1859
Pterotopteryx dodecadactyla Hübner, 1813

Argyresthiidae
Argyresthia abdominalis Zeller, 1839
Argyresthia albistria (Haworth, 1828)
Argyresthia aurulentella Stainton, 1849
Argyresthia bonnetella (Linnaeus, 1758)
Argyresthia brockeella (Hübner, 1813)
Argyresthia conjugella Zeller, 1839
Argyresthia curvella (Linnaeus, 1761)
Argyresthia fundella (Fischer von Röslerstamm, 1835)
Argyresthia glaucinella Zeller, 1839
Argyresthia goedartella (Linnaeus, 1758)
Argyresthia ivella (Haworth, 1828)
Argyresthia pruniella (Clerck, 1759)
Argyresthia pulchella Lienig & Zeller, 1846
Argyresthia pygmaeella (Denis & Schiffermüller, 1775)
Argyresthia retinella Zeller, 1839
Argyresthia semifusca (Haworth, 1828)
Argyresthia semitestacella (Curtis, 1833)
Argyresthia sorbiella (Treitschke, 1833)
Argyresthia spinosella Stainton, 1849
Argyresthia amiantella (Zeller, 1847)
Argyresthia arceuthina Zeller, 1839
Argyresthia bergiella (Ratzeburg, 1840)
Argyresthia dilectella Zeller, 1847
Argyresthia glabratella (Zeller, 1847)
Argyresthia illuminatella Zeller, 1839
Argyresthia laevigatella Herrich-Schäffer, 1855
Argyresthia praecocella Zeller, 1839
Argyresthia reticulata Staudinger, 1877
Argyresthia thuiella (Packard, 1871)
Argyresthia trifasciata Staudinger, 1871

Autostichidae
Apatema mediopallidum Walsingham, 1900
Apatema whalleyi (Popescu-Gorj & Capuse, 1965)
Oegoconia caradjai Popescu-Gorj & Capuse, 1965
Oegoconia deauratella (Herrich-Schäffer, 1854)
Oegoconia uralskella Popescu-Gorj & Capuse, 1965

Batrachedridae
Batrachedra pinicolella (Zeller, 1839)
Batrachedra praeangusta (Haworth, 1828)

Bedelliidae
Bedellia ehikella Szocs, 1967
Bedellia somnulentella (Zeller, 1847)

Blastobasidae
Blastobasis huemeri Sinev, 1993
Blastobasis phycidella (Zeller, 1839)
Hypatopa binotella (Thunberg, 1794)
Hypatopa inunctella Zeller, 1839
Hypatopa segnella (Zeller, 1873)

Brachodidae
Brachodes appendiculata (Esper, 1783)

Brahmaeidae
Lemonia dumi (Linnaeus, 1761)
Lemonia taraxaci (Denis & Schiffermüller, 1775)

Bucculatricidae
Bucculatrix absinthii Gartner, 1865
Bucculatrix albedinella (Zeller, 1839)
Bucculatrix argentisignella Herrich-Schäffer, 1855
Bucculatrix artemisiella Herrich-Schäffer, 1855
Bucculatrix bechsteinella (Bechstein & Scharfenberg, 1805)
Bucculatrix cidarella (Zeller, 1839)
Bucculatrix cristatella (Zeller, 1839)
Bucculatrix demaryella (Duponchel, 1840)
Bucculatrix fatigatella Heyden, 1863
Bucculatrix frangutella (Goeze, 1783)
Bucculatrix gnaphaliella (Treitschke, 1833)
Bucculatrix humiliella Herrich-Schäffer, 1855
Bucculatrix maritima Stainton, 1851
Bucculatrix nigricomella (Zeller, 1839)
Bucculatrix noltei Petry, 1912
Bucculatrix ratisbonensis Stainton, 1861
Bucculatrix thoracella (Thunberg, 1794)
Bucculatrix ulmella Zeller, 1848
Bucculatrix ulmifoliae M. Hering, 1931

Carposinidae
Carposina berberidella Herrich-Schäffer, 1854
Carposina scirrhosella Herrich-Schäffer, 1854

Chimabachidae
Dasystoma salicella (Hübner, 1796)
Diurnea fagella (Denis & Schiffermüller, 1775)
Diurnea lipsiella (Denis & Schiffermüller, 1775)

Choreutidae
Anthophila abhasica Danilevsky, 1969
Anthophila fabriciana (Linnaeus, 1767)
Choreutis diana (Hübner, 1822)
Choreutis pariana (Clerck, 1759)
Prochoreutis myllerana (Fabricius, 1794)
Prochoreutis sehestediana (Fabricius, 1776)
Tebenna bjerkandrella (Thunberg, 1784)
Tebenna chingana Danilevsky, 1969

Coleophoridae
Augasma aeratella (Zeller, 1839)
Coleophora absinthii Wocke, 1877
Coleophora acrisella Milliere, 1872
Coleophora adelogrammella Zeller, 1849
Coleophora adjectella Hering, 1937
Coleophora adjunctella Hodgkinson, 1882
Coleophora adspersella Benander, 1939
Coleophora ahenella Heinemann, 1877
Coleophora albella (Thunberg, 1788)
Coleophora albicans Zeller, 1849
Coleophora albicostella (Duponchel, 1842)
Coleophora albidella (Denis & Schiffermüller, 1775)
Coleophora albilineella Toll, 1960
Coleophora albitarsella Zeller, 1849
Coleophora alcyonipennella (Kollar, 1832)
Coleophora alnifoliae Barasch, 1934
Coleophora alticolella Zeller, 1849
Coleophora amellivora Baldizzone, 1979
Coleophora anatipenella (Hübner, 1796)
Coleophora argentula (Stephens, 1834)
Coleophora artemisicolella Bruand, 1855
Coleophora astragalella Zeller, 1849
Coleophora auricella (Fabricius, 1794)
Coleophora autumnella (Duponchel, 1843)
Coleophora badiipennella (Duponchel, 1843)
Coleophora ballotella (Fischer v. Röslerstamm, 1839)
Coleophora betulella Heinemann, 1877
Coleophora bilineatella Zeller, 1849
Coleophora binderella (Kollar, 1832)
Coleophora binotapennella (Duponchel, 1843)
Coleophora brevipalpella Wocke, 1874
Coleophora caelebipennella Zeller, 1839
Coleophora caespititiella Zeller, 1839
Coleophora campestriphaga Baldizzone & Patzak, 1980
Coleophora cecidophorella Oudejans, 1972
Coleophora chalcogrammella Zeller, 1839
Coleophora chamaedriella Bruand, 1852
Coleophora chrysanthemi Hofmann, 1869
Coleophora ciconiella Herrich-Schäffer, 1855
Coleophora clypeiferella Hofmann, 1871
Coleophora colutella (Fabricius, 1794)
Coleophora congeriella Staudinger, 1859
Coleophora conspicuella Zeller, 1849
Coleophora conyzae Zeller, 1868
Coleophora coracipennella (Hübner, 1796)
Coleophora cornutella Herrich-Schäffer, 1861
Coleophora coronillae Zeller, 1849
Coleophora currucipennella Zeller, 1839
Coleophora deauratella Lienig & Zeller, 1846
Coleophora dentiferella Toll, 1952
Coleophora dianthi Herrich-Schäffer, 1855
Coleophora dignella Toll, 1961
Coleophora directella Zeller, 1849
Coleophora discordella Zeller, 1849
Coleophora ditella Zeller, 1849
Coleophora expressella Klemensiewicz, 1902
Coleophora flavipennella (Duponchel, 1843)
Coleophora follicularis (Vallot, 1802)
Coleophora frankii Schmidt, 1886
Coleophora frischella (Linnaeus, 1758)
Coleophora fuscociliella Zeller, 1849
Coleophora fuscocuprella Herrich-Schäffer, 1855
Coleophora galatellae Hering, 1942
Coleophora galbulipennella Zeller, 1838
Coleophora gallipennella (Hübner, 1796)
Coleophora genistae Stainton, 1857
Coleophora glaseri Toll, 1961
Coleophora glaucicolella Wood, 1892
Coleophora glitzella Hofmann, 1869
Coleophora gnaphalii Zeller, 1839
Coleophora graminicolella Heinemann, 1876
Coleophora granulatella Zeller, 1849
Coleophora gryphipennella (Hübner, 1796)
Coleophora halophilella Zimmermann, 1926
Coleophora hartigi Toll, 1944
Coleophora hemerobiella (Scopoli, 1763)
Coleophora hydrolapathella Hering, 1921
Coleophora ibipennella Zeller, 1849
Coleophora idaeella Hofmann, 1869
Coleophora juncicolella Stainton, 1851
Coleophora kroneella Fuchs, 1899
Coleophora kuehnella (Goeze, 1783)
Coleophora laricella (Hübner, 1817)
Coleophora ledi Stainton, 1860
Coleophora limosipennella (Duponchel, 1843)
Coleophora lineolea (Haworth, 1828)
Coleophora linosyridella Fuchs, 1880
Coleophora linosyris Hering, 1937
Coleophora lithargyrinella Zeller, 1849
Coleophora lixella Zeller, 1849
Coleophora lusciniaepennella (Treitschke, 1833)
Coleophora lutipennella (Zeller, 1838)
Coleophora mayrella (Hübner, 1813)
Coleophora medelichensis Krone, 1908
Coleophora millefolii Zeller, 1849
Coleophora milvipennis Zeller, 1839
Coleophora motacillella Zeller, 1849
Coleophora murinella Tengstrom, 1848
Coleophora niveicostella Zeller, 1839
Coleophora niveistrigella Wocke, 1877
Coleophora nutantella Muhlig & Frey, 1857
Coleophora obscenella Herrich-Schäffer, 1855
Coleophora ochrea (Haworth, 1828)
Coleophora ochripennella Zeller, 1849
Coleophora odorariella Muhlig, 1857
Coleophora onobrychiella Zeller, 1849
Coleophora orbitella Zeller, 1849
Coleophora oriolella Zeller, 1849
Coleophora ornatipennella (Hübner, 1796)
Coleophora otidipennella (Hübner, 1817)
Coleophora pappiferella Hofmann, 1869
Coleophora paradrymidis Toll, 1949
Coleophora paripennella Zeller, 1839
Coleophora partitella Zeller, 1849
Coleophora pennella (Denis & Schiffermüller, 1775)
Coleophora peribenanderi Toll, 1943
Coleophora potentillae Elisha, 1885
Coleophora pratella Zeller, 1871
Coleophora prunifoliae Doets, 1944
Coleophora pseudociconiella Toll, 1952
Coleophora pseudoditella Baldizzone & Patzak, 1983
Coleophora pseudolinosyris Kasy, 1979
Coleophora ptarmicia Walsingham, 1910
Coleophora pulmonariella Ragonot, 1874
Coleophora pyrrhulipennella Zeller, 1839
Coleophora ramosella Zeller, 1849
Coleophora saponariella Heeger, 1848
Coleophora saturatella Stainton, 1850
Coleophora saxicolella (Duponchel, 1843)
Coleophora sergiella Falkovitsh, 1979
Coleophora serpylletorum Hering, 1889
Coleophora serratella (Linnaeus, 1761)
Coleophora serratulella Herrich-Schäffer, 1855
Coleophora siccifolia Stainton, 1856
Coleophora silenella Herrich-Schäffer, 1855
Coleophora solitariella Zeller, 1849
Coleophora spinella (Schrank, 1802)
Coleophora spiraeella Rebel, 1916
Coleophora squalorella Zeller, 1849
Coleophora squamella Constant, 1885
Coleophora squamosella Stainton, 1856
Coleophora sternipennella (Zetterstedt, 1839)
Coleophora stramentella Zeller, 1849
Coleophora striatipennella Nylander in Tengstrom, 1848
Coleophora succursella Herrich-Schäffer, 1855
Coleophora supinella Ortner, 1949
Coleophora sylvaticella Wood, 1892
Coleophora taeniipennella Herrich-Schäffer, 1855
Coleophora tamesis Waters, 1929
Coleophora tanaceti Muhlig, 1865
Coleophora therinella Tengstrom, 1848
Coleophora thymi Hering, 1942
Coleophora trifariella Zeller, 1849
Coleophora trifolii (Curtis, 1832)
Coleophora trigeminella Fuchs, 1881
Coleophora trochilella (Duponchel, 1843)
Coleophora unipunctella Zeller, 1849
Coleophora vacciniella Herrich-Schäffer, 1861
Coleophora versurella Zeller, 1849
Coleophora vestianella (Linnaeus, 1758)
Coleophora vibicella (Hübner, 1813)
Coleophora vibicigerella Zeller, 1839
Coleophora vicinella Zeller, 1849
Coleophora violacea (Strom, 1783)
Coleophora virgatella Zeller, 1849
Coleophora virgaureae Stainton, 1857
Coleophora vitisella Gregson, 1856
Coleophora vulnerariae Zeller, 1839
Coleophora vulpecula Zeller, 1849
Coleophora zelleriella Heinemann, 1854
Goniodoma auroguttella (Fischer v. Röslerstamm, 1841)
Metriotes lutarea (Haworth, 1828)

Cosmopterigidae
Cosmopterix lienigiella Zeller, 1846
Cosmopterix orichalcea Stainton, 1861
Cosmopterix schmidiella Frey, 1856
Cosmopterix scribaiella Zeller, 1850
Cosmopterix zieglerella (Hübner, 1810)
Eteobalea albiapicella (Duponchel, 1843)
Eteobalea anonymella (Riedl, 1965)
Eteobalea intermediella (Riedl, 1966)
Eteobalea serratella (Treitschke, 1833)
Eteobalea tririvella (Staudinger, 1870)
Isidiella nickerlii (Nickerl, 1864)
Limnaecia phragmitella Stainton, 1851
Pancalia leuwenhoekella (Linnaeus, 1761)
Pancalia schwarzella (Fabricius, 1798)
Pyroderces argyrogrammos (Zeller, 1847)
Pyroderces klimeschi Rebel, 1938
Sorhagenia janiszewskae Riedl, 1962
Sorhagenia lophyrella (Douglas, 1846)
Sorhagenia rhamniella (Zeller, 1839)
Stagmatophora heydeniella (Fischer von Röslerstamm, 1838)
Vulcaniella extremella (Wocke, 1871)
Vulcaniella pomposella (Zeller, 1839)

Cossidae
Cossus cossus (Linnaeus, 1758)
Dyspessa ulula (Borkhausen, 1790)
Parahypopta caestrum (Hübner, 1808)
Phragmataecia castaneae (Hübner, 1790)
Zeuzera pyrina (Linnaeus, 1761)

Crambidae
Acentria ephemerella (Denis & Schiffermüller, 1775)
Agriphila deliella (Hübner, 1813)
Agriphila geniculea (Haworth, 1811)
Agriphila inquinatella (Denis & Schiffermüller, 1775)
Agriphila poliellus (Treitschke, 1832)
Agriphila selasella (Hübner, 1813)
Agriphila straminella (Denis & Schiffermüller, 1775)
Agriphila tolli (Błeszyński, 1952)
Agriphila tristella (Denis & Schiffermüller, 1775)
Agrotera nemoralis (Scopoli, 1763)
Anania coronata (Hufnagel, 1767)
Anania crocealis (Hübner, 1796)
Anania funebris (Strom, 1768)
Anania fuscalis (Denis & Schiffermüller, 1775)
Anania hortulata (Linnaeus, 1758)
Anania lancealis (Denis & Schiffermüller, 1775)
Anania perlucidalis (Hübner, 1809)
Anania stachydalis (Germar, 1821)
Anania terrealis (Treitschke, 1829)
Anania testacealis (Zeller, 1847)
Anania verbascalis (Denis & Schiffermüller, 1775)
Ancylolomia palpella (Denis & Schiffermüller, 1775)
Antigastra catalaunalis (Duponchel, 1833)
Aporodes floralis (Hübner, 1809)
Atralata albofascialis (Treitschke, 1829)
Calamotropha aureliellus (Fischer v. Röslerstamm, 1841)
Calamotropha paludella (Hübner, 1824)
Cataclysta lemnata (Linnaeus, 1758)
Catoptria confusellus (Staudinger, 1882)
Catoptria falsella (Denis & Schiffermüller, 1775)
Catoptria fulgidella (Hübner, 1813)
Catoptria lythargyrella (Hübner, 1796)
Catoptria maculalis (Zetterstedt, 1839)
Catoptria margaritella (Denis & Schiffermüller, 1775)
Catoptria mytilella (Hübner, 1805)
Catoptria osthelderi (Lattin, 1950)
Catoptria permutatellus (Herrich-Schäffer, 1848)
Catoptria petrificella (Hübner, 1796)
Catoptria pinella (Linnaeus, 1758)
Catoptria verellus (Zincken, 1817)
Chilo phragmitella (Hübner, 1805)
Cholius luteolaris (Scopoli, 1772)
Chrysocrambus craterella (Scopoli, 1763)
Chrysoteuchia culmella (Linnaeus, 1758)
Crambus alienellus Germar & Kaulfuss, 1817
Crambus ericella (Hübner, 1813)
Crambus hamella (Thunberg, 1788)
Crambus lathoniellus (Zincken, 1817)
Crambus pascuella (Linnaeus, 1758)
Crambus perlella (Scopoli, 1763)
Crambus pratella (Linnaeus, 1758)
Crambus silvella (Hübner, 1813)
Crambus uliginosellus Zeller, 1850
Cynaeda dentalis (Denis & Schiffermüller, 1775)
Diasemia reticularis (Linnaeus, 1761)
Dolicharthria punctalis (Denis & Schiffermüller, 1775)
Donacaula forficella (Thunberg, 1794)
Donacaula mucronella (Denis & Schiffermüller, 1775)
Duponchelia fovealis Zeller, 1847
Ecpyrrhorrhoe rubiginalis (Hübner, 1796)
Elophila nymphaeata (Linnaeus, 1758)
Epascestria pustulalis (Hübner, 1823)
Euchromius ocellea (Haworth, 1811)
Eudonia lacustrata (Panzer, 1804)
Eudonia laetella (Zeller, 1846)
Eudonia mercurella (Linnaeus, 1758)
Eudonia murana (Curtis, 1827)
Eudonia pallida (Curtis, 1827)
Eudonia petrophila (Standfuss, 1848)
Eudonia sudetica (Zeller, 1839)
Eudonia truncicolella (Stainton, 1849)
Eurrhypis pollinalis (Denis & Schiffermüller, 1775)
Evergestis aenealis (Denis & Schiffermüller, 1775)
Evergestis extimalis (Scopoli, 1763)
Evergestis forficalis (Linnaeus, 1758)
Evergestis frumentalis (Linnaeus, 1761)
Evergestis limbata (Linnaeus, 1767)
Evergestis pallidata (Hufnagel, 1767)
Evergestis politalis (Denis & Schiffermüller, 1775)
Evergestis sophialis (Fabricius, 1787)
Friedlanderia cicatricella (Hübner, 1824)
Gesneria centuriella (Denis & Schiffermüller, 1775)
Heliothela wulfeniana (Scopoli, 1763)
Loxostege deliblatica Szent-Ivany & Uhrik-Meszaros, 1942
Loxostege sticticalis (Linnaeus, 1761)
Loxostege turbidalis (Treitschke, 1829)
Mecyna flavalis (Denis & Schiffermüller, 1775)
Mecyna trinalis (Denis & Schiffermüller, 1775)
Metasia ophialis (Treitschke, 1829)
Nascia cilialis (Hübner, 1796)
Nomophila noctuella (Denis & Schiffermüller, 1775)
Nymphula nitidulata (Hufnagel, 1767)
Ostrinia nubilalis (Hübner, 1796)
Ostrinia palustralis (Hübner, 1796)
Ostrinia quadripunctalis (Denis & Schiffermüller, 1775)
Palpita vitrealis (Rossi, 1794)
Paracorsia repandalis (Denis & Schiffermüller, 1775)
Parapoynx nivalis (Denis & Schiffermüller, 1775)
Parapoynx stratiotata (Linnaeus, 1758)
Paratalanta hyalinalis (Hübner, 1796)
Paratalanta pandalis (Hübner, 1825)
Pediasia aridella (Thunberg, 1788)
Pediasia contaminella (Hübner, 1796)
Pediasia fascelinella (Hübner, 1813)
Pediasia luteella (Denis & Schiffermüller, 1775)
Pediasia truncatellus (Zetterstedt, 1839)
Platytes alpinella (Hübner, 1813)
Platytes cerussella (Denis & Schiffermüller, 1775)
Pleuroptya ruralis (Scopoli, 1763)
Psammotis pulveralis (Hübner, 1796)
Pyrausta aurata (Scopoli, 1763)
Pyrausta castalis Treitschke, 1829
Pyrausta cingulata (Linnaeus, 1758)
Pyrausta coracinalis Leraut, 1982
Pyrausta despicata (Scopoli, 1763)
Pyrausta falcatalis Guenee, 1854
Pyrausta nigrata (Scopoli, 1763)
Pyrausta obfuscata (Scopoli, 1763)
Pyrausta ostrinalis (Hübner, 1796)
Pyrausta porphyralis (Denis & Schiffermüller, 1775)
Pyrausta purpuralis (Linnaeus, 1758)
Pyrausta sanguinalis (Linnaeus, 1767)
Schoenobius gigantella (Denis & Schiffermüller, 1775)
Scirpophaga praelata (Scopoli, 1763)
Sclerocona acutella (Eversmann, 1842)
Scoparia ambigualis (Treitschke, 1829)
Scoparia ancipitella (La Harpe, 1855)
Scoparia basistrigalis Knaggs, 1866
Scoparia ingratella (Zeller, 1846)
Scoparia pyralella (Denis & Schiffermüller, 1775)
Scoparia subfusca Haworth, 1811
Sitochroa palealis (Denis & Schiffermüller, 1775)
Sitochroa verticalis (Linnaeus, 1758)
Talis quercella (Denis & Schiffermüller, 1775)
Thisanotia chrysonuchella (Scopoli, 1763)
Titanio normalis (Hübner, 1796)
Udea accolalis (Zeller, 1867)
Udea alpinalis (Denis & Schiffermüller, 1775)
Udea decrepitalis (Herrich-Schäffer, 1848)
Udea elutalis (Denis & Schiffermüller, 1775)
Udea ferrugalis (Hübner, 1796)
Udea fulvalis (Hübner, 1809)
Udea hamalis (Thunberg, 1788)
Udea inquinatalis (Lienig & Zeller, 1846)
Udea lutealis (Hübner, 1809)
Udea nebulalis (Hübner, 1796)
Udea olivalis (Denis & Schiffermüller, 1775)
Udea prunalis (Denis & Schiffermüller, 1775)
Uresiphita gilvata (Fabricius, 1794)
Xanthocrambus saxonellus (Zincken, 1821)

Douglasiidae
Klimeschia transversella (Zeller, 1839)
Tinagma balteolella (Fischer von Röslerstamm, 1841)
Tinagma ocnerostomella (Stainton, 1850)
Tinagma perdicella Zeller, 1839
Tinagma signatum Gaedike, 1991

Drepanidae
Achlya flavicornis (Linnaeus, 1758)
Cilix glaucata (Scopoli, 1763)
Cymatophorina diluta (Denis & Schiffermüller, 1775)
Drepana curvatula (Borkhausen, 1790)
Drepana falcataria (Linnaeus, 1758)
Falcaria lacertinaria (Linnaeus, 1758)
Habrosyne pyritoides (Hufnagel, 1766)
Ochropacha duplaris (Linnaeus, 1761)
Polyploca ridens (Fabricius, 1787)
Sabra harpagula (Esper, 1786)
Tethea ocularis (Linnaeus, 1767)
Tethea or (Denis & Schiffermüller, 1775)
Tetheella fluctuosa (Hübner, 1803)
Thyatira batis (Linnaeus, 1758)
Watsonalla binaria (Hufnagel, 1767)
Watsonalla cultraria (Fabricius, 1775)

Elachistidae
Agonopterix adspersella (Kollar, 1832)
Agonopterix alstromeriana (Clerck, 1759)
Agonopterix angelicella (Hübner, 1813)
Agonopterix arenella (Denis & Schiffermüller, 1775)
Agonopterix assimilella (Treitschke, 1832)
Agonopterix astrantiae (Heinemann, 1870)
Agonopterix atomella (Denis & Schiffermüller, 1775)
Agonopterix capreolella (Zeller, 1839)
Agonopterix carduella (Hübner, 1817)
Agonopterix ciliella (Stainton, 1849)
Agonopterix cnicella (Treitschke, 1832)
Agonopterix conterminella (Zeller, 1839)
Agonopterix curvipunctosa (Haworth, 1811)
Agonopterix doronicella (Wocke, 1849)
Agonopterix furvella (Treitschke, 1832)
Agonopterix heracliana (Linnaeus, 1758)
Agonopterix hippomarathri (Nickerl, 1864)
Agonopterix hypericella (Hübner, 1817)
Agonopterix kaekeritziana (Linnaeus, 1767)
Agonopterix laterella (Denis & Schiffermüller, 1775)
Agonopterix liturosa (Haworth, 1811)
Agonopterix nanatella (Stainton, 1849)
Agonopterix nervosa (Haworth, 1811)
Agonopterix ocellana (Fabricius, 1775)
Agonopterix oinochroa (Turati, 1879)
Agonopterix pallorella (Zeller, 1839)
Agonopterix parilella (Treitschke, 1835)
Agonopterix petasitis (Standfuss, 1851)
Agonopterix propinquella (Treitschke, 1835)
Agonopterix purpurea (Haworth, 1811)
Agonopterix putridella (Denis & Schiffermüller, 1775)
Agonopterix quadripunctata (Wocke, 1857)
Agonopterix rotundella (Douglas, 1846)
Agonopterix scopariella (Heinemann, 1870)
Agonopterix selini (Heinemann, 1870)
Agonopterix senecionis (Nickerl, 1864)
Agonopterix subpropinquella (Stainton, 1849)
Agonopterix yeatiana (Fabricius, 1781)
Anchinia cristalis (Scopoli, 1763)
Anchinia daphnella (Denis & Schiffermüller, 1775)
Blastodacna atra (Haworth, 1828)
Blastodacna hellerella (Duponchel, 1838)
Blastodacna vinolentella (Herrich-Schäffer, 1854)
Chrysoclista abchasica (Sinev, 1986)
Chrysoclista lathamella (T. B. Fletcher, 1936)
Chrysoclista linneella (Clerck, 1759)
Chrysoclista splendida Karsholt, 1997
Depressaria absynthiella Herrich-Schäffer, 1865
Depressaria albipunctella (Denis & Schiffermüller, 1775)
Depressaria artemisiae Nickerl, 1864
Depressaria badiella (Hübner, 1796)
Depressaria beckmanni Heinemann, 1870
Depressaria bupleurella Heinemann, 1870
Depressaria cervicella Herrich-Schäffer, 1854
Depressaria chaerophylli Zeller, 1839
Depressaria daucella (Denis & Schiffermüller, 1775)
Depressaria depressana (Fabricius, 1775)
Depressaria douglasella Stainton, 1849
Depressaria emeritella Stainton, 1849
Depressaria hofmanni Stainton, 1861
Depressaria libanotidella Schlager, 1849
Depressaria olerella Zeller, 1854
Depressaria pimpinellae Zeller, 1839
Depressaria pulcherrimella Stainton, 1849
Depressaria radiella (Goeze, 1783)
Depressaria silesiaca Heinemann, 1870
Depressaria sordidatella Tengstrom, 1848
Depressaria ultimella Stainton, 1849
Dystebenna stephensi (Stainton, 1849)
Elachista adscitella Stainton, 1851
Elachista agelensis Traugott-Olsen, 1996
Elachista argentella (Clerck, 1759)
Elachista bedellella (Sircom, 1848)
Elachista bisulcella (Duponchel, 1843)
Elachista chrysodesmella Zeller, 1850
Elachista collitella (Duponchel, 1843)
Elachista dispilella Zeller, 1839
Elachista dispunctella (Duponchel, 1843)
Elachista fasciola Parenti, 1983
Elachista gangabella Zeller, 1850
Elachista gormella Nielsen & Traugott-Olsen, 1987
Elachista gregori Traugott-Olsen, 1988
Elachista hedemanni Rebel, 1899
Elachista heringi Rebel, 1899
Elachista klimeschiella Parenti, 2002
Elachista littoricola Le Marchand, 1938
Elachista manni Traugott-Olsen, 1990
Elachista metella Kaila, 2002
Elachista nitidulella (Herrich-Schäffer, 1885)
Elachista nolckeni Sulcs, 1992
Elachista obliquella Stainton, 1854
Elachista pollinariella Zeller, 1839
Elachista pollutella Duponchel, 1843
Elachista pullicomella Zeller, 1839
Elachista rudectella Stainton, 1851
Elachista spumella Caradja, 1920
Elachista squamosella (Duponchel, 1843)
Elachista steueri Traugott-Olsen, 1990
Elachista subalbidella Schlager, 1847
Elachista subocellea (Stephens, 1834)
Elachista svenssoni Traugott-Olsen, 1988
Elachista triatomea (Haworth, 1828)
Elachista unifasciella (Haworth, 1828)
Elachista albidella Nylander, 1848
Elachista albifrontella (Hübner, 1817)
Elachista alpinella Stainton, 1854
Elachista anserinella Zeller, 1839
Elachista apicipunctella Stainton, 1849
Elachista atricomella Stainton, 1849
Elachista biatomella (Stainton, 1848)
Elachista bifasciella Treitschke, 1833
Elachista canapennella (Hübner, 1813)
Elachista cinereopunctella (Haworth, 1828)
Elachista compsa Traugott-Olsen, 1974
Elachista consortella Stainton, 1851
Elachista diederichsiella E. Hering, 1889
Elachista elegans Frey, 1859
Elachista eleochariella Stainton, 1851
Elachista exactella (Herrich-Schäffer, 1855)
Elachista freyerella (Hübner, 1825)
Elachista gleichenella (Fabricius, 1781)
Elachista griseella (Duponchel, 1843)
Elachista herrichii Frey, 1859
Elachista humilis Zeller, 1850
Elachista juliensis Frey, 1870
Elachista kilmunella Stainton, 1849
Elachista luticomella Zeller, 1839
Elachista maculicerusella (Bruand, 1859)
Elachista martinii O. Hofmann, 1898
Elachista nobilella Zeller, 1839
Elachista occidentalis Frey, 1882
Elachista ornithopodella Frey, 1859
Elachista orstadii N. Palm, 1943
Elachista pigerella (Herrich-Schäffer, 1854)
Elachista poae Stainton, 1855
Elachista pomerana Frey, 1870
Elachista quadripunctella (Hübner, 1825)
Elachista rufocinerea (Haworth, 1828)
Elachista serricornis Stainton, 1854
Elachista stabilella Stainton, 1858
Elachista subnigrella Douglas, 1853
Elachista tetragonella (Herrich-Schäffer, 1855)
Elachista trapeziella Stainton, 1849
Elachista utonella Frey, 1856
Ethmia bipunctella (Fabricius, 1775)
Ethmia candidella (Alphéraky, 1908)
Ethmia dodecea (Haworth, 1828)
Ethmia pusiella (Linnaeus, 1758)
Ethmia quadrillella (Goeze, 1783)
Ethmia terminella T. B. Fletcher, 1938
Exaeretia ciniflonella (Lienig & Zeller, 1846)
Exaeretia culcitella (Herrich-Schäffer, 1854)
Exaeretia preisseckeri (Rebel, 1937)
Exaeretia allisella Stainton, 1849
Fuchsia luteella (Heinemann, 1870)
Haplochrois ochraceella (Rebel, 1903)
Heinemannia festivella (Denis & Schiffermüller, 1775)
Heinemannia laspeyrella (Hübner, 1796)
Hypercallia citrinalis (Scopoli, 1763)
Levipalpus hepatariella (Lienig & Zeller, 1846)
Luquetia lobella (Denis & Schiffermüller, 1775)
Orophia denisella (Denis & Schiffermüller, 1775)
Orophia ferrugella (Denis & Schiffermüller, 1775)
Orophia sordidella (Hübner, 1796)
Perittia farinella (Thunberg, 1794)
Perittia herrichiella (Herrich-Schäffer, 1855)
Semioscopis avellanella (Hübner, 1793)
Semioscopis oculella (Thunberg, 1794)
Semioscopis steinkellneriana (Denis & Schiffermüller, 1775)
Semioscopis strigulana (Denis & Schiffermüller, 1775)
Spuleria flavicaput (Haworth, 1828)
Stephensia abbreviatella (Stainton, 1851)
Stephensia brunnichella (Linnaeus, 1767)
Telechrysis tripuncta (Haworth, 1828)

Endromidae
Endromis versicolora (Linnaeus, 1758)

Epermeniidae
Epermenia chaerophyllella (Goeze, 1783)
Epermenia falciformis (Haworth, 1828)
Epermenia illigerella (Hübner, 1813)
Epermenia insecurella (Stainton, 1854)
Epermenia petrusellus (Heylaerts, 1883)
Epermenia iniquellus (Wocke, 1867)
Epermenia profugella (Stainton, 1856)
Epermenia pontificella (Hübner, 1796)
Ochromolopis ictella (Hübner, 1813)
Phaulernis dentella (Zeller, 1839)
Phaulernis fulviguttella (Zeller, 1839)

Erebidae
Amata phegea (Linnaeus, 1758)
Arctia caja (Linnaeus, 1758)
Arctia festiva (Hufnagel, 1766)
Arctia villica (Linnaeus, 1758)
Arctornis l-nigrum (Muller, 1764)
Atolmis rubricollis (Linnaeus, 1758)
Callimorpha dominula (Linnaeus, 1758)
Calliteara abietis (Denis & Schiffermüller, 1775)
Calliteara pudibunda (Linnaeus, 1758)
Calymma communimacula (Denis & Schiffermüller, 1775)
Calyptra thalictri (Borkhausen, 1790)
Catephia alchymista (Denis & Schiffermüller, 1775)
Catocala conversa (Esper, 1783)
Catocala electa (Vieweg, 1790)
Catocala elocata (Esper, 1787)
Catocala fraxini (Linnaeus, 1758)
Catocala fulminea (Scopoli, 1763)
Catocala hymenaea (Denis & Schiffermüller, 1775)
Catocala nupta (Linnaeus, 1767)
Catocala nymphagoga (Esper, 1787)
Catocala promissa (Denis & Schiffermüller, 1775)
Catocala puerpera (Giorna, 1791)
Catocala sponsa (Linnaeus, 1767)
Chelis maculosa (Gerning, 1780)
Colobochyla salicalis (Denis & Schiffermüller, 1775)
Coscinia cribraria (Linnaeus, 1758)
Coscinia striata (Linnaeus, 1758)
Cybosia mesomella (Linnaeus, 1758)
Diacrisia sannio (Linnaeus, 1758)
Diaphora luctuosa (Hübner, 1831)
Diaphora mendica (Clerck, 1759)
Dicallomera fascelina (Linnaeus, 1758)
Dysauxes ancilla (Linnaeus, 1767)
Dysgonia algira (Linnaeus, 1767)
Eilema complana (Linnaeus, 1758)
Eilema depressa (Esper, 1787)
Eilema griseola (Hübner, 1803)
Eilema lurideola (Zincken, 1817)
Eilema lutarella (Linnaeus, 1758)
Eilema palliatella (Scopoli, 1763)
Eilema pseudocomplana (Daniel, 1939)
Eilema pygmaeola (Doubleday, 1847)
Eilema sororcula (Hufnagel, 1766)
Eublemma minutata (Fabricius, 1794)
Eublemma parva (Hübner, 1808)
Eublemma purpurina (Denis & Schiffermüller, 1775)
Euclidia mi (Clerck, 1759)
Euclidia glyphica (Linnaeus, 1758)
Euplagia quadripunctaria (Poda, 1761)
Euproctis chrysorrhoea (Linnaeus, 1758)
Euproctis similis (Fuessly, 1775)
Grammodes stolida (Fabricius, 1775)
Herminia grisealis (Denis & Schiffermüller, 1775)
Herminia tarsicrinalis (Knoch, 1782)
Herminia tarsipennalis (Treitschke, 1835)
Hypena crassalis (Fabricius, 1787)
Hypena obesalis Treitschke, 1829
Hypena proboscidalis (Linnaeus, 1758)
Hypena rostralis (Linnaeus, 1758)
Hypenodes humidalis Doubleday, 1850
Hyphantria cunea (Drury, 1773)
Hyphoraia aulica (Linnaeus, 1758)
Idia calvaria (Denis & Schiffermüller, 1775)
Laelia coenosa (Hübner, 1808)
Laspeyria flexula (Denis & Schiffermüller, 1775)
Leucoma salicis (Linnaeus, 1758)
Lithosia quadra (Linnaeus, 1758)
Lygephila craccae (Denis & Schiffermüller, 1775)
Lygephila ludicra (Hübner, 1790)
Lygephila lusoria (Linnaeus, 1758)
Lygephila pastinum (Treitschke, 1826)
Lygephila viciae (Hübner, 1822)
Lymantria dispar (Linnaeus, 1758)
Lymantria monacha (Linnaeus, 1758)
Macrochilo cribrumalis (Hübner, 1793)
Miltochrista miniata (Forster, 1771)
Minucia lunaris (Denis & Schiffermüller, 1775)
Nudaria mundana (Linnaeus, 1761)
Ocneria rubea (Denis & Schiffermüller, 1775)
Odice arcuinna (Hübner, 1790)
Orgyia recens (Hübner, 1819)
Orgyia antiqua (Linnaeus, 1758)
Paidia rica (Freyer, 1858)
Paracolax tristalis (Fabricius, 1794)
Parascotia fuliginaria (Linnaeus, 1761)
Parasemia plantaginis (Linnaeus, 1758)
Parocneria detrita (Esper, 1785)
Pechipogo strigilata (Linnaeus, 1758)
Pelosia muscerda (Hufnagel, 1766)
Pelosia obtusa (Herrich-Schäffer, 1852)
Penthophera morio (Linnaeus, 1767)
Pericallia matronula (Linnaeus, 1758)
Phragmatobia fuliginosa (Linnaeus, 1758)
Phragmatobia luctifera (Denis & Schiffermüller, 1775)
Phytometra viridaria (Clerck, 1759)
Polypogon tentacularia (Linnaeus, 1758)
Rhyparia purpurata (Linnaeus, 1758)
Rivula sericealis (Scopoli, 1763)
Schrankia costaestrigalis (Stephens, 1834)
Schrankia taenialis (Hübner, 1809)
Scoliopteryx libatrix (Linnaeus, 1758)
Setina irrorella (Linnaeus, 1758)
Setina roscida (Denis & Schiffermüller, 1775)
Simplicia rectalis (Eversmann, 1842)
Spilosoma lubricipeda (Linnaeus, 1758)
Spilosoma lutea (Hufnagel, 1766)
Spilosoma urticae (Esper, 1789)
Thumatha senex (Hübner, 1808)
Trisateles emortualis (Denis & Schiffermüller, 1775)
Tyria jacobaeae (Linnaeus, 1758)
Utetheisa pulchella (Linnaeus, 1758)
Watsonarctia deserta (Bartel, 1902)
Zanclognatha lunalis (Scopoli, 1763)
Zanclognatha zelleralis (Wocke, 1850)

Eriocraniidae
Dyseriocrania subpurpurella (Haworth, 1828)
Eriocrania cicatricella (Zetterstedt, 1839)
Eriocrania salopiella (Stainton, 1854)
Eriocrania sangii (Wood, 1891)
Eriocrania semipurpurella (Stephens, 1835)
Eriocrania sparrmannella (Bosc, 1791)
Heringocrania unimaculella (Zetterstedt, 1839)
Paracrania chrysolepidella (Zeller, 1851)

Gelechiidae
Acompsia cinerella (Clerck, 1759)
Acompsia minorella Rebel, 1899
Acompsia tripunctella (Denis & Schiffermüller, 1775)
Acompsia schmidtiellus (Heyden, 1848)
Altenia scriptella (Hübner, 1796)
Anacampsis blattariella (Hübner, 1796)
Anacampsis obscurella (Denis & Schiffermüller, 1775)
Anacampsis populella (Clerck, 1759)
Anacampsis scintillella (Fischer von Röslerstamm, 1841)
Anacampsis temerella (Lienig & Zeller, 1846)
Anacampsis timidella (Wocke, 1887)
Anarsia lineatella Zeller, 1839
Anarsia spartiella (Schrank, 1802)
Anasphaltis renigerellus (Zeller, 1839)
Apodia bifractella (Duponchel, 1843)
Aproaerema anthyllidella (Hübner, 1813)
Argolamprotes micella (Denis & Schiffermüller, 1775)
Aristotelia brizella (Treitschke, 1833)
Aristotelia decurtella (Hübner, 1813)
Aristotelia ericinella (Zeller, 1839)
Aristotelia subericinella (Duponchel, 1843)
Aroga flavicomella (Zeller, 1839)
Aroga velocella (Duponchel, 1838)
Athrips mouffetella (Linnaeus, 1758)
Athrips nigricostella (Duponchel, 1842)
Athrips pruinosella (Lienig & Zeller, 1846)
Athrips rancidella (Herrich-Schäffer, 1854)
Atremaea lonchoptera Staudinger, 1871
Brachmia blandella (Fabricius, 1798)
Brachmia dimidiella (Denis & Schiffermüller, 1775)
Brachmia inornatella (Douglas, 1850)
Bryotropha affinis (Haworth, 1828)
Bryotropha basaltinella (Zeller, 1839)
Bryotropha boreella (Douglas, 1851)
Bryotropha desertella (Douglas, 1850)
Bryotropha domestica (Haworth, 1828)
Bryotropha galbanella (Zeller, 1839)
Bryotropha patockai Elsner & Karsholt, 2003
Bryotropha senectella (Zeller, 1839)
Bryotropha similis (Stainton, 1854)
Bryotropha terrella (Denis & Schiffermüller, 1775)
Carpatolechia aenigma (Sattler, 1983)
Carpatolechia alburnella (Zeller, 1839)
Carpatolechia decorella (Haworth, 1812)
Carpatolechia fugacella (Zeller, 1839)
Carpatolechia fugitivella (Zeller, 1839)
Carpatolechia notatella (Hübner, 1813)
Carpatolechia proximella (Hübner, 1796)
Caryocolum alsinella (Zeller, 1868)
Caryocolum amaurella (M. Hering, 1924)
Caryocolum blandella (Douglas, 1852)
Caryocolum blandelloides Karsholt, 1981
Caryocolum cassella (Walker, 1864)
Caryocolum cauligenella (Schmid, 1863)
Caryocolum fischerella (Treitschke, 1833)
Caryocolum huebneri (Haworth, 1828)
Caryocolum junctella (Douglas, 1851)
Caryocolum klosi (Rebel, 1917)
Caryocolum kroesmanniella (Herrich-Schäffer, 1854)
Caryocolum leucomelanella (Zeller, 1839)
Caryocolum marmorea (Haworth, 1828)
Caryocolum proxima (Haworth, 1828)
Caryocolum schleichi (Christoph, 1872)
Caryocolum tischeriella (Zeller, 1839)
Caryocolum tricolorella (Haworth, 1812)
Caryocolum vicinella (Douglas, 1851)
Caulastrocecis furfurella (Staudinger, 1871)
Chionodes continuella (Zeller, 1839)
Chionodes distinctella (Zeller, 1839)
Chionodes electella (Zeller, 1839)
Chionodes fumatella (Douglas, 1850)
Chionodes ignorantella (Herrich-Schäffer, 1854)
Chionodes luctuella (Hübner, 1793)
Chionodes lugubrella (Fabricius, 1794)
Chionodes nebulosella (Heinemann, 1870)
Chionodes tragicella (Heyden, 1865)
Chionodes viduella (Fabricius, 1794)
Chrysoesthia drurella (Fabricius, 1775)
Chrysoesthia sexguttella (Thunberg, 1794)
Chrysoesthia verrucosa Tokar, 1999
Coleotechnites piceaella (Kearfott, 1903)
Cosmardia moritzella (Treitschke, 1835)
Crossobela trinotella (Herrich-Schäffer, 1856)
Dactylotula altithermella (Walsingham, 1903)
Dichomeris alacella (Zeller, 1839)
Dichomeris barbella (Denis & Schiffermüller, 1775)
Dichomeris derasella (Denis & Schiffermüller, 1775)
Dichomeris juniperella (Linnaeus, 1761)
Dichomeris latipennella (Rebel, 1937)
Dichomeris limosellus (Schlager, 1849)
Dichomeris marginella (Fabricius, 1781)
Dichomeris rasilella (Herrich-Schäffer, 1854)
Dichomeris ustalella (Fabricius, 1794)
Ephysteris inustella (Zeller, 1847)
Eulamprotes atrella (Denis & Schiffermüller, 1775)
Eulamprotes libertinella (Zeller, 1872)
Eulamprotes ochricapilla (Rebel, 1903)
Eulamprotes plumbella (Heinemann, 1870)
Eulamprotes superbella (Zeller, 1839)
Eulamprotes unicolorella (Duponchel, 1843)
Eulamprotes wilkella (Linnaeus, 1758)
Exoteleia dodecella (Linnaeus, 1758)
Filatima incomptella (Herrich-Schäffer, 1854)
Filatima spurcella (Duponchel, 1843)
Gelechia asinella (Hübner, 1796)
Gelechia basipunctella Herrich-Schäffer, 1854
Gelechia cuneatella Douglas, 1852
Gelechia muscosella Zeller, 1839
Gelechia nigra (Haworth, 1828)
Gelechia rhombella (Denis & Schiffermüller, 1775)
Gelechia rhombelliformis Staudinger, 1871
Gelechia sabinellus (Zeller, 1839)
Gelechia scotinella Herrich-Schäffer, 1854
Gelechia sestertiella Herrich-Schäffer, 1854
Gelechia sororculella (Hübner, 1817)
Gelechia turpella (Denis & Schiffermüller, 1775)
Gladiovalva aizpuruai Vives, 1990
Gnorimoschema steueri Povolny, 1975
Helcystogramma arulensis (Rebel, 1929)
Helcystogramma lineolella (Zeller, 1839)
Helcystogramma lutatella (Herrich-Schäffer, 1854)
Helcystogramma rufescens (Haworth, 1828)
Helcystogramma triannulella (Herrich-Schäffer, 1854)
Hypatima rhomboidella (Linnaeus, 1758)
Isophrictis anthemidella (Wocke, 1871)
Isophrictis striatella (Denis & Schiffermüller, 1775)
Iwaruna klimeschi Wolff, 1958
Klimeschiopsis kiningerella (Duponchel, 1843)
Megacraspedus albovenata Junnilainen, 2010
Megacraspedus balneariellus (Chretien, 1907)
Megacraspedus binotella (Duponchel, 1843)
Megacraspedus dolosellus (Zeller, 1839)
Megacraspedus fallax (Mann, 1867)
Megacraspedus imparellus (Fischer von Röslerstamm, 1843)
Megacraspedus separatellus (Fischer von Röslerstamm, 1843)
Mesophleps silacella (Hübner, 1796)
Metzneria aestivella (Zeller, 1839)
Metzneria aprilella (Herrich-Schäffer, 1854)
Metzneria ehikeella Gozmany, 1954
Metzneria lappella (Linnaeus, 1758)
Metzneria metzneriella (Stainton, 1851)
Metzneria neuropterella (Zeller, 1839)
Metzneria paucipunctella (Zeller, 1839)
Metzneria santolinella (Amsel, 1936)
Mirificarma cytisella (Treitschke, 1833)
Mirificarma eburnella (Denis & Schiffermüller, 1775)
Mirificarma interrupta (Curtis, 1827)
Mirificarma lentiginosella (Zeller, 1839)
Mirificarma maculatella (Hübner, 1796)
Mirificarma mulinella (Zeller, 1839)
Monochroa conspersella (Herrich-Schäffer, 1854)
Monochroa cytisella (Curtis, 1837)
Monochroa divisella (Douglas, 1850)
Monochroa elongella (Heinemann, 1870)
Monochroa hornigi (Staudinger, 1883)
Monochroa inflexella Svensson, 1992
Monochroa lucidella (Stephens, 1834)
Monochroa lutulentella (Zeller, 1839)
Monochroa nomadella (Zeller, 1868)
Monochroa palustrellus (Douglas, 1850)
Monochroa parvulata (Gozmany, 1957)
Monochroa rumicetella (O. Hofmann, 1868)
Monochroa sepicolella (Herrich-Schäffer, 1854)
Monochroa servella (Zeller, 1839)
Monochroa simplicella (Lienig & Zeller, 1846)
Monochroa suffusella (Douglas, 1850)
Monochroa tenebrella (Hübner, 1817)
Neofaculta ericetella (Geyer, 1832)
Neofaculta infernella (Herrich-Schäffer, 1854)
Neofriseria peliella (Treitschke, 1835)
Neofriseria singula (Staudinger, 1876)
Neotelphusa sequax (Haworth, 1828)
Nothris lemniscellus (Zeller, 1839)
Nothris verbascella (Denis & Schiffermüller, 1775)
Parachronistis albiceps (Zeller, 1839)
Parastenolechia nigrinotella (Zeller, 1847)
Pexicopia malvella (Hübner, 1805)
Platyedra subcinerea (Haworth, 1828)
Prolita sexpunctella (Fabricius, 1794)
Prolita solutella (Zeller, 1839)
Pseudotelphusa paripunctella (Thunberg, 1794)
Pseudotelphusa scalella (Scopoli, 1763)
Pseudotelphusa tessella (Linnaeus, 1758)
Psoricoptera gibbosella (Zeller, 1839)
Ptocheuusa abnormella (Herrich-Schäffer, 1854)
Ptocheuusa inopella (Zeller, 1839)
Pyncostola bohemiella (Nickerl, 1864)
Recurvaria leucatella (Clerck, 1759)
Recurvaria nanella (Denis & Schiffermüller, 1775)
Scrobipalpa acuminatella (Sircom, 1850)
Scrobipalpa adaptata (Povolny, 2001)
Scrobipalpa arenbergeri Povolny, 1973
Scrobipalpa artemisiella (Treitschke, 1833)
Scrobipalpa atriplicella (Fischer von Röslerstamm, 1841)
Scrobipalpa chrysanthemella (E. Hofmann, 1867)
Scrobipalpa erichi Povolny, 1964
Scrobipalpa nitentella (Fuchs, 1902)
Scrobipalpa obsoletella (Fischer von Röslerstamm, 1841)
Scrobipalpa ocellatella (Boyd, 1858)
Scrobipalpa pauperella (Heinemann, 1870)
Scrobipalpa proclivella (Fuchs, 1886)
Scrobipalpa samadensis (Pfaffenzeller, 1870)
Scrobipalpula psilella (Herrich-Schäffer, 1854)
Scrobipalpula tussilaginis (Stainton, 1867)
Sitotroga cerealella (Olivier, 1789)
Sophronia ascalis Gozmany, 1951
Sophronia chilonella (Treitschke, 1833)
Sophronia consanguinella Herrich-Schäffer, 1854
Sophronia humerella (Denis & Schiffermüller, 1775)
Sophronia illustrella (Hübner, 1796)
Sophronia semicostella (Hübner, 1813)
Sophronia sicariellus (Zeller, 1839)
Stenolechia gemmella (Linnaeus, 1758)
Stenolechiodes pseudogemmellus Elsner, 1996
Stomopteryx hungaricella Gozmany, 1957
Stomopteryx remissella (Zeller, 1847)
Syncopacma albifrontella (Heinemann, 1870)
Syncopacma azosterella (Herrich-Schäffer, 1854)
Syncopacma captivella (Herrich-Schäffer, 1854)
Syncopacma cinctella (Clerck, 1759)
Syncopacma cincticulella (Bruand, 1851)
Syncopacma coronillella (Treitschke, 1833)
Syncopacma larseniella Gozmany, 1957
Syncopacma ochrofasciella (Toll, 1936)
Syncopacma polychromella (Rebel, 1902)
Syncopacma sangiella (Stainton, 1863)
Syncopacma suecicella (Wolff, 1958)
Syncopacma taeniolella (Zeller, 1839)
Syncopacma vinella (Bankes, 1898)
Syncopacma wormiella (Wolff, 1958)
Teleiodes flavimaculella (Herrich-Schäffer, 1854)
Teleiodes luculella (Hübner, 1813)
Teleiodes saltuum (Zeller, 1878)
Teleiodes vulgella (Denis & Schiffermüller, 1775)
Teleiodes wagae (Nowicki, 1860)
Teleiopsis diffinis (Haworth, 1828)
Thiotricha subocellea (Stephens, 1834)
Xystophora carchariella (Zeller, 1839)
Xystophora pulveratella (Herrich-Schäffer, 1854)

Geometridae
Abraxas grossulariata (Linnaeus, 1758)
Abraxas sylvata (Scopoli, 1763)
Acasis appensata (Eversmann, 1842)
Acasis viretata (Hübner, 1799)
Aethalura punctulata (Denis & Schiffermüller, 1775)
Agriopis aurantiaria (Hübner, 1799)
Agriopis bajaria (Denis & Schiffermüller, 1775)
Agriopis leucophaearia (Denis & Schiffermüller, 1775)
Agriopis marginaria (Fabricius, 1776)
Alcis bastelbergeri (Hirschke, 1908)
Alcis jubata (Thunberg, 1788)
Alcis repandata (Linnaeus, 1758)
Aleucis distinctata (Herrich-Schäffer, 1839)
Alsophila aceraria (Denis & Schiffermüller, 1775)
Alsophila aescularia (Denis & Schiffermüller, 1775)
Angerona prunaria (Linnaeus, 1758)
Anticlea derivata (Denis & Schiffermüller, 1775)
Anticollix sparsata (Treitschke, 1828)
Apeira syringaria (Linnaeus, 1758)
Aplasta ononaria (Fuessly, 1783)
Aplocera efformata (Guenee, 1858)
Aplocera plagiata (Linnaeus, 1758)
Aplocera praeformata (Hübner, 1826)
Apocheima hispidaria (Denis & Schiffermüller, 1775)
Archiearis parthenias (Linnaeus, 1761)
Arichanna melanaria (Linnaeus, 1758)
Artiora evonymaria (Denis & Schiffermüller, 1775)
Ascotis selenaria (Denis & Schiffermüller, 1775)
Aspitates gilvaria (Denis & Schiffermüller, 1775)
Asthena albulata (Hufnagel, 1767)
Asthena anseraria (Herrich-Schäffer, 1855)
Biston betularia (Linnaeus, 1758)
Biston strataria (Hufnagel, 1767)
Boudinotiana notha (Hübner, 1803)
Boudinotiana puella (Esper, 1787)
Bupalus piniaria (Linnaeus, 1758)
Cabera exanthemata (Scopoli, 1763)
Cabera pusaria (Linnaeus, 1758)
Campaea honoraria (Denis & Schiffermüller, 1775)
Campaea margaritaria (Linnaeus, 1761)
Camptogramma bilineata (Linnaeus, 1758)
Carsia sororiata (Hübner, 1813)
Cataclysme riguata (Hübner, 1813)
Catarhoe cuculata (Hufnagel, 1767)
Catarhoe rubidata (Denis & Schiffermüller, 1775)
Cepphis advenaria (Hübner, 1790)
Charissa obscurata (Denis & Schiffermüller, 1775)
Charissa pullata (Denis & Schiffermüller, 1775)
Charissa ambiguata (Duponchel, 1830)
Charissa intermedia (Wehrli, 1917)
Charissa glaucinaria (Hübner, 1799)
Chesias legatella (Denis & Schiffermüller, 1775)
Chesias rufata (Fabricius, 1775)
Chiasmia clathrata (Linnaeus, 1758)
Chlorissa cloraria (Hübner, 1813)
Chlorissa viridata (Linnaeus, 1758)
Chloroclysta miata (Linnaeus, 1758)
Chloroclysta siterata (Hufnagel, 1767)
Chloroclystis v-ata (Haworth, 1809)
Cidaria fulvata (Forster, 1771)
Cleora cinctaria (Denis & Schiffermüller, 1775)
Cleorodes lichenaria (Hufnagel, 1767)
Coenocalpe lapidata (Hübner, 1809)
Coenotephria salicata (Denis & Schiffermüller, 1775)
Coenotephria tophaceata (Denis & Schiffermüller, 1775)
Colostygia aptata (Hübner, 1813)
Colostygia kollariaria (Herrich-Schäffer, 1848)
Colostygia olivata (Denis & Schiffermüller, 1775)
Colostygia pectinataria (Knoch, 1781)
Colotois pennaria (Linnaeus, 1761)
Comibaena bajularia (Denis & Schiffermüller, 1775)
Cosmorhoe ocellata (Linnaeus, 1758)
Costaconvexa polygrammata (Borkhausen, 1794)
Crocallis elinguaria (Linnaeus, 1758)
Crocallis tusciaria (Borkhausen, 1793)
Cyclophora linearia (Hübner, 1799)
Cyclophora porata (Linnaeus, 1767)
Cyclophora punctaria (Linnaeus, 1758)
Cyclophora albiocellaria (Hübner, 1789)
Cyclophora albipunctata (Hufnagel, 1767)
Cyclophora annularia (Fabricius, 1775)
Cyclophora pendularia (Clerck, 1759)
Cyclophora quercimontaria (Bastelberger, 1897)
Cyclophora ruficiliaria (Herrich-Schäffer, 1855)
Deileptenia ribeata (Clerck, 1759)
Dyscia conspersaria (Denis & Schiffermüller, 1775)
Dysstroma citrata (Linnaeus, 1761)
Dysstroma infuscata (Tengstrom, 1869)
Dysstroma truncata (Hufnagel, 1767)
Earophila badiata (Denis & Schiffermüller, 1775)
Ecliptopera capitata (Herrich-Schäffer, 1839)
Ecliptopera silaceata (Denis & Schiffermüller, 1775)
Ectropis crepuscularia (Denis & Schiffermüller, 1775)
Electrophaes corylata (Thunberg, 1792)
Elophos operaria (Hübner, 1813)
Elophos dilucidaria (Denis & Schiffermüller, 1775)
Elophos vittaria (Thunberg, 1788)
Ematurga atomaria (Linnaeus, 1758)
Ennomos alniaria (Linnaeus, 1758)
Ennomos autumnaria (Werneburg, 1859)
Ennomos erosaria (Denis & Schiffermüller, 1775)
Ennomos fuscantaria (Haworth, 1809)
Ennomos quercinaria (Hufnagel, 1767)
Entephria caesiata (Denis & Schiffermüller, 1775)
Entephria flavicinctata (Hübner, 1813)
Entephria infidaria (de La Harpe, 1853)
Entephria nobiliaria (Herrich-Schäffer, 1852)
Epione repandaria (Hufnagel, 1767)
Epione vespertaria (Linnaeus, 1767)
Epirranthis diversata (Denis & Schiffermüller, 1775)
Epirrhoe alternata (Muller, 1764)
Epirrhoe galiata (Denis & Schiffermüller, 1775)
Epirrhoe hastulata (Hübner, 1790)
Epirrhoe molluginata (Hübner, 1813)
Epirrhoe pupillata (Thunberg, 1788)
Epirrhoe rivata (Hübner, 1813)
Epirrhoe tristata (Linnaeus, 1758)
Epirrita autumnata (Borkhausen, 1794)
Epirrita christyi (Allen, 1906)
Epirrita dilutata (Denis & Schiffermüller, 1775)
Erannis defoliaria (Clerck, 1759)
Euchoeca nebulata (Scopoli, 1763)
Eulithis mellinata (Fabricius, 1787)
Eulithis populata (Linnaeus, 1758)
Eulithis prunata (Linnaeus, 1758)
Eulithis testata (Linnaeus, 1761)
Euphyia biangulata (Haworth, 1809)
Euphyia frustata (Treitschke, 1828)
Euphyia unangulata (Haworth, 1809)
Eupithecia abbreviata Stephens, 1831
Eupithecia abietaria (Goeze, 1781)
Eupithecia absinthiata (Clerck, 1759)
Eupithecia actaeata Walderdorff, 1869
Eupithecia alliaria Staudinger, 1870
Eupithecia analoga Djakonov, 1926
Eupithecia assimilata Doubleday, 1856
Eupithecia cauchiata (Duponchel, 1831)
Eupithecia centaureata (Denis & Schiffermüller, 1775)
Eupithecia conterminata (Lienig, 1846)
Eupithecia denotata (Hübner, 1813)
Eupithecia distinctaria Herrich-Schäffer, 1848
Eupithecia dodoneata Guenee, 1858
Eupithecia egenaria Herrich-Schäffer, 1848
Eupithecia ericeata (Rambur, 1833)
Eupithecia exiguata (Hübner, 1813)
Eupithecia expallidata Doubleday, 1856
Eupithecia extraversaria Herrich-Schäffer, 1852
Eupithecia gelidata Moschler, 1860
Eupithecia gueneata Milliere, 1862
Eupithecia haworthiata Doubleday, 1856
Eupithecia icterata (de Villers, 1789)
Eupithecia immundata (Lienig, 1846)
Eupithecia impurata (Hübner, 1813)
Eupithecia indigata (Hübner, 1813)
Eupithecia innotata (Hufnagel, 1767)
Eupithecia insigniata (Hübner, 1790)
Eupithecia intricata (Zetterstedt, 1839)
Eupithecia inturbata (Hübner, 1817)
Eupithecia lanceata (Hübner, 1825)
Eupithecia laquaearia Herrich-Schäffer, 1848
Eupithecia lariciata (Freyer, 1841)
Eupithecia linariata (Denis & Schiffermüller, 1775)
Eupithecia millefoliata Rossler, 1866
Eupithecia nanata (Hübner, 1813)
Eupithecia ochridata Schutze & Pinker, 1968
Eupithecia orphnata W. Petersen, 1909
Eupithecia pauxillaria Boisduval, 1840
Eupithecia pimpinellata (Hübner, 1813)
Eupithecia plumbeolata (Haworth, 1809)
Eupithecia pulchellata Stephens, 1831
Eupithecia pusillata (Denis & Schiffermüller, 1775)
Eupithecia pygmaeata (Hübner, 1799)
Eupithecia pyreneata Mabille, 1871
Eupithecia satyrata (Hübner, 1813)
Eupithecia selinata Herrich-Schäffer, 1861
Eupithecia semigraphata Bruand, 1850
Eupithecia silenata Assmann, 1848
Eupithecia simpliciata (Haworth, 1809)
Eupithecia sinuosaria (Eversmann, 1848)
Eupithecia subfuscata (Haworth, 1809)
Eupithecia subumbrata (Denis & Schiffermüller, 1775)
Eupithecia succenturiata (Linnaeus, 1758)
Eupithecia tantillaria Boisduval, 1840
Eupithecia tenuiata (Hübner, 1813)
Eupithecia tripunctaria Herrich-Schäffer, 1852
Eupithecia trisignaria Herrich-Schäffer, 1848
Eupithecia valerianata (Hübner, 1813)
Eupithecia venosata (Fabricius, 1787)
Eupithecia veratraria Herrich-Schäffer, 1848
Eupithecia virgaureata Doubleday, 1861
Eupithecia vulgata (Haworth, 1809)
Eustroma reticulata (Denis & Schiffermüller, 1775)
Fagivorina arenaria (Hufnagel, 1767)
Gagitodes sagittata (Fabricius, 1787)
Gandaritis pyraliata (Denis & Schiffermüller, 1775)
Geometra papilionaria (Linnaeus, 1758)
Glacies alpinata (Scopoli, 1763)
Gnophos furvata (Denis & Schiffermüller, 1775)
Gnophos dumetata Treitschke, 1827
Gymnoscelis rufifasciata (Haworth, 1809)
Heliomata glarearia (Denis & Schiffermüller, 1775)
Hemistola chrysoprasaria (Esper, 1795)
Hemithea aestivaria (Hübner, 1789)
Horisme corticata (Treitschke, 1835)
Horisme radicaria (de La Harpe, 1855)
Horisme tersata (Denis & Schiffermüller, 1775)
Horisme vitalbata (Denis & Schiffermüller, 1775)
Hydrelia flammeolaria (Hufnagel, 1767)
Hydrelia sylvata (Denis & Schiffermüller, 1775)
Hydria cervinalis (Scopoli, 1763)
Hydria undulata (Linnaeus, 1758)
Hydriomena furcata (Thunberg, 1784)
Hydriomena impluviata (Denis & Schiffermüller, 1775)
Hydriomena ruberata (Freyer, 1831)
Hylaea fasciaria (Linnaeus, 1758)
Hypomecis punctinalis (Scopoli, 1763)
Hypomecis roboraria (Denis & Schiffermüller, 1775)
Hypoxystis pluviaria (Fabricius, 1787)
Idaea aureolaria (Denis & Schiffermüller, 1775)
Idaea aversata (Linnaeus, 1758)
Idaea biselata (Hufnagel, 1767)
Idaea contiguaria (Hübner, 1799)
Idaea degeneraria (Hübner, 1799)
Idaea deversaria (Herrich-Schäffer, 1847)
Idaea dilutaria (Hübner, 1799)
Idaea dimidiata (Hufnagel, 1767)
Idaea emarginata (Linnaeus, 1758)
Idaea filicata (Hübner, 1799)
Idaea fuscovenosa (Goeze, 1781)
Idaea humiliata (Hufnagel, 1767)
Idaea inquinata (Scopoli, 1763)
Idaea laevigata (Scopoli, 1763)
Idaea moniliata (Denis & Schiffermüller, 1775)
Idaea muricata (Hufnagel, 1767)
Idaea nitidata (Herrich-Schäffer, 1861)
Idaea obsoletaria (Rambur, 1833)
Idaea ochrata (Scopoli, 1763)
Idaea pallidata (Denis & Schiffermüller, 1775)
Idaea politaria (Hübner, 1799)
Idaea rubraria (Staudinger, 1901)
Idaea rufaria (Hübner, 1799)
Idaea rusticata (Denis & Schiffermüller, 1775)
Idaea seriata (Schrank, 1802)
Idaea serpentata (Hufnagel, 1767)
Idaea straminata (Borkhausen, 1794)
Idaea subsericeata (Haworth, 1809)
Idaea sylvestraria (Hübner, 1799)
Idaea trigeminata (Haworth, 1809)
Isturgia arenacearia (Denis & Schiffermüller, 1775)
Isturgia murinaria (Denis & Schiffermüller, 1775)
Isturgia roraria (Fabricius, 1776)
Jodis lactearia (Linnaeus, 1758)
Jodis putata (Linnaeus, 1758)
Lampropteryx otregiata (Metcalfe, 1917)
Lampropteryx suffumata (Denis & Schiffermüller, 1775)
Larentia clavaria (Haworth, 1809)
Ligdia adustata (Denis & Schiffermüller, 1775)
Lithostege farinata (Hufnagel, 1767)
Lithostege griseata (Denis & Schiffermüller, 1775)
Lobophora halterata (Hufnagel, 1767)
Lomaspilis marginata (Linnaeus, 1758)
Lomographa bimaculata (Fabricius, 1775)
Lomographa temerata (Denis & Schiffermüller, 1775)
Lycia hirtaria (Clerck, 1759)
Lycia isabellae (Harrison, 1914)
Lycia pomonaria (Hübner, 1790)
Lycia zonaria (Denis & Schiffermüller, 1775)
Lythria cruentaria (Hufnagel, 1767)
Lythria purpuraria (Linnaeus, 1758)
Macaria alternata (Denis & Schiffermüller, 1775)
Macaria artesiaria (Denis & Schiffermüller, 1775)
Macaria brunneata (Thunberg, 1784)
Macaria liturata (Clerck, 1759)
Macaria notata (Linnaeus, 1758)
Macaria signaria (Hübner, 1809)
Macaria wauaria (Linnaeus, 1758)
Martania taeniata (Stephens, 1831)
Melanthia procellata (Denis & Schiffermüller, 1775)
Mesoleuca albicillata (Linnaeus, 1758)
Mesotype didymata (Linnaeus, 1758)
Mesotype parallelolineata (Retzius, 1783)
Mesotype verberata (Scopoli, 1763)
Minoa murinata (Scopoli, 1763)
Narraga fasciolaria (Hufnagel, 1767)
Nebula achromaria (de La Harpe, 1853)
Nothocasis sertata (Hübner, 1817)
Nycterosea obstipata (Fabricius, 1794)
Odezia atrata (Linnaeus, 1758)
Odontopera bidentata (Clerck, 1759)
Operophtera brumata (Linnaeus, 1758)
Operophtera fagata (Scharfenberg, 1805)
Opisthograptis luteolata (Linnaeus, 1758)
Orthonama vittata (Borkhausen, 1794)
Ourapteryx sambucaria (Linnaeus, 1758)
Pachycnemia hippocastanaria (Hübner, 1799)
Paraboarmia viertlii (Bohatsch, 1883)
Paradarisa consonaria (Hübner, 1799)
Parectropis similaria (Hufnagel, 1767)
Pareulype berberata (Denis & Schiffermüller, 1775)
Pasiphila chloerata (Mabille, 1870)
Pasiphila debiliata (Hübner, 1817)
Pasiphila rectangulata (Linnaeus, 1758)
Pelurga comitata (Linnaeus, 1758)
Pennithera firmata (Hübner, 1822)
Perconia strigillaria (Hübner, 1787)
Peribatodes rhomboidaria (Denis & Schiffermüller, 1775)
Peribatodes secundaria (Denis & Schiffermüller, 1775)
Perizoma affinitata (Stephens, 1831)
Perizoma albulata (Denis & Schiffermüller, 1775)
Perizoma alchemillata (Linnaeus, 1758)
Perizoma bifaciata (Haworth, 1809)
Perizoma blandiata (Denis & Schiffermüller, 1775)
Perizoma flavofasciata (Thunberg, 1792)
Perizoma hydrata (Treitschke, 1829)
Perizoma lugdunaria (Herrich-Schäffer, 1855)
Perizoma minorata (Treitschke, 1828)
Perizoma obsoletata (Herrich-Schäffer, 1838)
Petrophora chlorosata (Scopoli, 1763)
Phaiogramma etruscaria (Zeller, 1849)
Phibalapteryx virgata (Hufnagel, 1767)
Phigalia pilosaria (Denis & Schiffermüller, 1775)
Philereme transversata (Hufnagel, 1767)
Philereme vetulata (Denis & Schiffermüller, 1775)
Plagodis dolabraria (Linnaeus, 1767)
Plagodis pulveraria (Linnaeus, 1758)
Plemyria rubiginata (Denis & Schiffermüller, 1775)
Pseudopanthera macularia (Linnaeus, 1758)
Pseudoterpna pruinata (Hufnagel, 1767)
Psodos quadrifaria (Sulzer, 1776)
Pterapherapteryx sexalata (Retzius, 1783)
Pungeleria capreolaria (Denis & Schiffermüller, 1775)
Rheumaptera hastata (Linnaeus, 1758)
Rheumaptera subhastata (Nolcken, 1870)
Rhodometra sacraria (Linnaeus, 1767)
Rhodostrophia vibicaria (Clerck, 1759)
Schistostege decussata (Denis & Schiffermüller, 1775)
Scopula flaccidaria (Zeller, 1852)
Scopula floslactata (Haworth, 1809)
Scopula immutata (Linnaeus, 1758)
Scopula incanata (Linnaeus, 1758)
Scopula marginepunctata (Goeze, 1781)
Scopula subpunctaria (Herrich-Schäffer, 1847)
Scopula ternata Schrank, 1802
Scopula caricaria (Reutti, 1853)
Scopula corrivalaria (Kretschmar, 1862)
Scopula decorata (Denis & Schiffermüller, 1775)
Scopula immorata (Linnaeus, 1758)
Scopula nemoraria (Hübner, 1799)
Scopula nigropunctata (Hufnagel, 1767)
Scopula ornata (Scopoli, 1763)
Scopula rubiginata (Hufnagel, 1767)
Scopula umbelaria (Hübner, 1813)
Scopula virgulata (Denis & Schiffermüller, 1775)
Scotopteryx bipunctaria (Denis & Schiffermüller, 1775)
Scotopteryx chenopodiata (Linnaeus, 1758)
Scotopteryx coarctaria (Denis & Schiffermüller, 1775)
Scotopteryx luridata (Hufnagel, 1767)
Scotopteryx moeniata (Scopoli, 1763)
Scotopteryx mucronata (Scopoli, 1763)
Selenia dentaria (Fabricius, 1775)
Selenia lunularia (Hübner, 1788)
Selenia tetralunaria (Hufnagel, 1767)
Selidosema brunnearia (de Villers, 1789)
Selidosema plumaria (Denis & Schiffermüller, 1775)
Siona lineata (Scopoli, 1763)
Spargania luctuata (Denis & Schiffermüller, 1775)
Stegania cararia (Hübner, 1790)
Stegania dilectaria (Hübner, 1790)
Synopsia sociaria (Hübner, 1799)
Tephronia sepiaria (Hufnagel, 1767)
Thalera fimbrialis (Scopoli, 1763)
Thera britannica (Turner, 1925)
Thera cognata (Thunberg, 1792)
Thera juniperata (Linnaeus, 1758)
Thera obeliscata (Hübner, 1787)
Thera variata (Denis & Schiffermüller, 1775)
Thera vetustata (Denis & Schiffermüller, 1775)
Therapis flavicaria (Denis & Schiffermüller, 1775)
Theria rupicapraria (Denis & Schiffermüller, 1775)
Thetidia smaragdaria (Fabricius, 1787)
Timandra comae Schmidt, 1931
Trichopteryx carpinata (Borkhausen, 1794)
Trichopteryx polycommata (Denis & Schiffermüller, 1775)
Triphosa dubitata (Linnaeus, 1758)
Venusia blomeri (Curtis, 1832)
Venusia cambrica Curtis, 1839
Xanthorhoe biriviata (Borkhausen, 1794)
Xanthorhoe designata (Hufnagel, 1767)
Xanthorhoe ferrugata (Clerck, 1759)
Xanthorhoe fluctuata (Linnaeus, 1758)
Xanthorhoe incursata (Hübner, 1813)
Xanthorhoe montanata (Denis & Schiffermüller, 1775)
Xanthorhoe quadrifasiata (Clerck, 1759)
Xanthorhoe spadicearia (Denis & Schiffermüller, 1775)

Glyphipterigidae
Acrolepia autumnitella Curtis, 1838
Acrolepiopsis assectella (Zeller, 1839)
Acrolepiopsis betulella (Curtis, 1838)
Digitivalva arnicella (Heyden, 1863)
Digitivalva perlepidella (Stainton, 1849)
Digitivalva reticulella (Hübner, 1796)
Digitivalva granitella (Treitschke, 1833)
Digitivalva pulicariae (Klimesch, 1956)
Glyphipterix bergstraesserella (Fabricius, 1781)
Glyphipterix equitella (Scopoli, 1763)
Glyphipterix forsterella (Fabricius, 1781)
Glyphipterix haworthana (Stephens, 1834)
Glyphipterix schoenicolella Boyd, 1859
Glyphipterix simpliciella (Stephens, 1834)
Glyphipterix thrasonella (Scopoli, 1763)
Orthotelia sparganella (Thunberg, 1788)

Gracillariidae
Acrocercops brongniardella (Fabricius, 1798)
Aristaea pavoniella (Zeller, 1847)
Aspilapteryx limosella (Duponchel, 1843)
Aspilapteryx tringipennella (Zeller, 1839)
Callisto denticulella (Thunberg, 1794)
Callisto insperatella (Nickerl, 1864)
Caloptilia alchimiella (Scopoli, 1763)
Caloptilia azaleella (Brants, 1913)
Caloptilia betulicola (M. Hering, 1928)
Caloptilia cuculipennella (Hübner, 1796)
Caloptilia elongella (Linnaeus, 1761)
Caloptilia falconipennella (Hübner, 1813)
Caloptilia fidella (Reutti, 1853)
Caloptilia fribergensis (Fritzsche, 1871)
Caloptilia hauderi (Rebel, 1906)
Caloptilia hemidactylella (Denis & Schiffermüller, 1775)
Caloptilia populetorum (Zeller, 1839)
Caloptilia robustella Jackh, 1972
Caloptilia roscipennella (Hübner, 1796)
Caloptilia rufipennella (Hübner, 1796)
Caloptilia semifascia (Haworth, 1828)
Caloptilia stigmatella (Fabricius, 1781)
Calybites phasianipennella (Hübner, 1813)
Calybites quadrisignella (Zeller, 1839)
Cameraria ohridella Deschka & Dimic, 1986
Dialectica imperialella (Zeller, 1847)
Euspilapteryx auroguttella Stephens, 1835
Gracillaria loriolella Frey, 1881
Gracillaria syringella (Fabricius, 1794)
Leucospilapteryx omissella (Stainton, 1848)
Micrurapteryx kollariella (Zeller, 1839)
Ornixola caudulatella (Zeller, 1839)
Parectopa ononidis (Zeller, 1839)
Parectopa robiniella Clemens, 1863
Parornix anglicella (Stainton, 1850)
Parornix anguliferella (Zeller, 1847)
Parornix betulae (Stainton, 1854)
Parornix carpinella (Frey, 1863)
Parornix devoniella (Stainton, 1850)
Parornix fagivora (Frey, 1861)
Parornix finitimella (Zeller, 1850)
Parornix petiolella (Frey, 1863)
Parornix scoticella (Stainton, 1850)
Parornix szocsi Gozmany, 1952
Parornix tenella (Rebel, 1919)
Parornix torquillella (Zeller, 1850)
Phyllocnistis labyrinthella (Bjerkander, 1790)
Phyllocnistis saligna (Zeller, 1839)
Phyllocnistis unipunctella (Stephens, 1834)
Phyllocnistis xenia M. Hering, 1936
Phyllonorycter abrasella (Duponchel, 1843)
Phyllonorycter acaciella (Duponchel, 1843)
Phyllonorycter acerifoliella (Zeller, 1839)
Phyllonorycter agilella (Zeller, 1846)
Phyllonorycter alpina (Frey, 1856)
Phyllonorycter anderidae (W. Fletcher, 1885)
Phyllonorycter apparella (Herrich-Schäffer, 1855)
Phyllonorycter blancardella (Fabricius, 1781)
Phyllonorycter cavella (Zeller, 1846)
Phyllonorycter cerasicolella (Herrich-Schäffer, 1855)
Phyllonorycter comparella (Duponchel, 1843)
Phyllonorycter connexella (Zeller, 1846)
Phyllonorycter coryli (Nicelli, 1851)
Phyllonorycter corylifoliella (Hübner, 1796)
Phyllonorycter cydoniella (Denis & Schiffermüller, 1775)
Phyllonorycter delitella (Duponchel, 1843)
Phyllonorycter distentella (Zeller, 1846)
Phyllonorycter dubitella (Herrich-Schäffer, 1855)
Phyllonorycter emberizaepenella (Bouche, 1834)
Phyllonorycter esperella (Goeze, 1783)
Phyllonorycter eugregori A. & Z. Lastuvka, 2006
Phyllonorycter fraxinella (Zeller, 1846)
Phyllonorycter froelichiella (Zeller, 1839)
Phyllonorycter geniculella (Ragonot, 1874)
Phyllonorycter harrisella (Linnaeus, 1761)
Phyllonorycter heegeriella (Zeller, 1846)
Phyllonorycter helianthemella (Herrich-Schäffer, 1861)
Phyllonorycter hilarella (Zetterstedt, 1839)
Phyllonorycter ilicifoliella (Duponchel, 1843)
Phyllonorycter insignitella (Zeller, 1846)
Phyllonorycter issikii (Kumata, 1963)
Phyllonorycter joannisi (Le Marchand, 1936)
Phyllonorycter junoniella (Zeller, 1846)
Phyllonorycter klemannella (Fabricius, 1781)
Phyllonorycter kuhlweiniella (Zeller, 1839)
Phyllonorycter lantanella (Schrank, 1802)
Phyllonorycter lautella (Zeller, 1846)
Phyllonorycter leucographella (Zeller, 1850)
Phyllonorycter maestingella (Muller, 1764)
Phyllonorycter mannii (Zeller, 1846)
Phyllonorycter medicaginella (Gerasimov, 1930)
Phyllonorycter mespilella (Hübner, 1805)
Phyllonorycter muelleriella (Zeller, 1839)
Phyllonorycter nicellii (Stainton, 1851)
Phyllonorycter nigrescentella (Logan, 1851)
Phyllonorycter oxyacanthae (Frey, 1856)
Phyllonorycter parisiella (Wocke, 1848)
Phyllonorycter pastorella (Zeller, 1846)
Phyllonorycter platani (Staudinger, 1870)
Phyllonorycter populifoliella (Treitschke, 1833)
Phyllonorycter pyrifoliella (Gerasimov, 1933)
Phyllonorycter quercifoliella (Zeller, 1839)
Phyllonorycter quinqueguttella (Stainton, 1851)
Phyllonorycter rajella (Linnaeus, 1758)
Phyllonorycter robiniella (Clemens, 1859)
Phyllonorycter roboris (Zeller, 1839)
Phyllonorycter sagitella (Bjerkander, 1790)
Phyllonorycter salicicolella (Sircom, 1848)
Phyllonorycter salictella (Zeller, 1846)
Phyllonorycter scabiosella (Douglas, 1853)
Phyllonorycter schreberella (Fabricius, 1781)
Phyllonorycter scitulella (Duponchel, 1843)
Phyllonorycter scopariella (Zeller, 1846)
Phyllonorycter sorbi (Frey, 1855)
Phyllonorycter spinicolella (Zeller, 1846)
Phyllonorycter staintoniella (Nicelli, 1853)
Phyllonorycter stettinensis (Nicelli, 1852)
Phyllonorycter strigulatella (Lienig & Zeller, 1846)
Phyllonorycter tenerella (de Joannis, 1915)
Phyllonorycter tristrigella (Haworth, 1828)
Phyllonorycter ulmifoliella (Hübner, 1817)
Phyllonorycter viminetorum (Stainton, 1854)
Povolnya leucapennella (Stephens, 1835)
Sauterina hofmanniella (Schleich, 1867)

Heliodinidae
Heliodines roesella (Linnaeus, 1758)
Antispila metallella (Denis & Schiffermüller, 1775)
Antispila treitschkiella (Fischer von Röslerstamm, 1843)
Antispilina ludwigi M. Hering, 1941
Heliozela hammoniella Sorhagen, 1885
Heliozela resplendella (Stainton, 1851)
Heliozela sericiella (Haworth, 1828)

Hepialidae
Hepialus humuli (Linnaeus, 1758)
Pharmacis fusconebulosa (DeGeer, 1778)
Pharmacis lupulina (Linnaeus, 1758)
Phymatopus hecta (Linnaeus, 1758)
Triodia sylvina (Linnaeus, 1761)

Incurvariidae
Alloclemensia mesospilella (Herrich-Schäffer, 1854)
Incurvaria koerneriella (Zeller, 1839)
Incurvaria masculella (Denis & Schiffermüller, 1775)
Incurvaria oehlmanniella (Hübner, 1796)
Incurvaria pectinea Haworth, 1828
Incurvaria praelatella (Denis & Schiffermüller, 1775)
Incurvaria vetulella (Zetterstedt, 1839)
Phylloporia bistrigella (Haworth, 1828)

Lasiocampidae
Cosmotriche lobulina (Denis & Schiffermüller, 1775)
Dendrolimus pini (Linnaeus, 1758)
Eriogaster catax (Linnaeus, 1758)
Eriogaster lanestris (Linnaeus, 1758)
Eriogaster rimicola (Denis & Schiffermüller, 1775)
Euthrix potatoria (Linnaeus, 1758)
Gastropacha quercifolia (Linnaeus, 1758)
Gastropacha populifolia (Denis & Schiffermüller, 1775)
Lasiocampa quercus (Linnaeus, 1758)
Lasiocampa trifolii (Denis & Schiffermüller, 1775)
Macrothylacia rubi (Linnaeus, 1758)
Malacosoma castrensis (Linnaeus, 1758)
Malacosoma neustria (Linnaeus, 1758)
Odonestis pruni (Linnaeus, 1758)
Phyllodesma ilicifolia (Linnaeus, 1758)
Phyllodesma tremulifolia (Hübner, 1810)
Poecilocampa populi (Linnaeus, 1758)
Trichiura crataegi (Linnaeus, 1758)

Lecithoceridae
Lecithocera nigrana (Duponchel, 1836)

Limacodidae
Apoda limacodes (Hufnagel, 1766)
Heterogenea asella (Denis & Schiffermüller, 1775)

Lyonetiidae
Leucoptera aceris (Fuchs, 1903)
Leucoptera heringiella Toll, 1938
Leucoptera laburnella (Stainton, 1851)
Leucoptera lotella (Stainton, 1859)
Leucoptera lustratella (Herrich-Schäffer, 1855)
Leucoptera malifoliella (O. Costa, 1836)
Leucoptera onobrychidella Klimesch, 1937
Leucoptera sinuella (Reutti, 1853)
Leucoptera spartifoliella (Hübner, 1813)
Lyonetia clerkella (Linnaeus, 1758)
Lyonetia ledi Wocke, 1859
Lyonetia prunifoliella (Hübner, 1796)
Lyonetia pulverulentella Zeller, 1839
Phyllobrostis hartmanni Staudinger, 1867

Lypusidae
Amphisbatis incongruella (Stainton, 1849)
Lypusa maurella (Denis & Schiffermüller, 1775)
Pseudatemelia flavifrontella (Denis & Schiffermüller, 1775)
Pseudatemelia latipennella (Jackh, 1959)
Pseudatemelia subochreella (Doubleday, 1859)
Pseudatemelia elsae Svensson, 1982
Pseudatemelia josephinae (Toll, 1956)

Micropterigidae
Micropterix allionella (Fabricius, 1794)
Micropterix aruncella (Scopoli, 1763)
Micropterix aureatella (Scopoli, 1763)
Micropterix calthella (Linnaeus, 1761)
Micropterix myrtetella Zeller, 1850
Micropterix osthelderi Heath, 1975
Micropterix schaefferi Heath, 1975
Micropterix tunbergella (Fabricius, 1787)

Millieridae
Millieria dolosalis (Heydenreich, 1851)

Momphidae
Mompha langiella (Hübner, 1796)
Mompha idaei (Zeller, 1839)
Mompha miscella (Denis & Schiffermüller, 1775)
Mompha bradleyi Riedl, 1965
Mompha confusella Koster & Sinev, 1996
Mompha conturbatella (Hübner, 1819)
Mompha divisella Herrich-Schäffer, 1854
Mompha epilobiella (Denis & Schiffermüller, 1775)
Mompha lacteella (Stephens, 1834)
Mompha ochraceella (Curtis, 1839)
Mompha propinquella (Stainton, 1851)
Mompha sturnipennella (Treitschke, 1833)
Mompha subbistrigella (Haworth, 1828)
Mompha locupletella (Denis & Schiffermüller, 1775)
Mompha raschkiella (Zeller, 1839)
Mompha terminella (Humphreys & Westwood, 1845)

Nepticulidae
Acalyptris loranthella (Klimesch, 1937)
Bohemannia auriciliella (de Joannis, 1908)
Bohemannia pulverosella (Stainton, 1849)
Bohemannia quadrimaculella (Boheman, 1853)
Ectoedemia agrimoniae (Frey, 1858)
Ectoedemia albifasciella (Heinemann, 1871)
Ectoedemia angulifasciella (Stainton, 1849)
Ectoedemia arcuatella (Herrich-Schäffer, 1855)
Ectoedemia argyropeza (Zeller, 1839)
Ectoedemia atricollis (Stainton, 1857)
Ectoedemia caradjai (Groschke, 1944)
Ectoedemia cerris (Zimmermann, 1944)
Ectoedemia contorta van Nieukerken, 1985
Ectoedemia gilvipennella (Klimesch, 1946)
Ectoedemia hannoverella (Glitz, 1872)
Ectoedemia heringi (Toll, 1934)
Ectoedemia intimella (Zeller, 1848)
Ectoedemia klimeschi (Skala, 1933)
Ectoedemia liechtensteini (Zimmermann, 1944)
Ectoedemia mahalebella (Klimesch, 1936)
Ectoedemia minimella (Zetterstedt, 1839)
Ectoedemia occultella (Linnaeus, 1767)
Ectoedemia preisseckeri (Klimesch, 1941)
Ectoedemia rubivora (Wocke, 1860)
Ectoedemia rufifrontella (Caradja, 1920)
Ectoedemia spinosella (de Joannis, 1908)
Ectoedemia subbimaculella (Haworth, 1828)
Ectoedemia turbidella (Zeller, 1848)
Ectoedemia decentella (Herrich-Schäffer, 1855)
Ectoedemia louisella (Sircom, 1849)
Ectoedemia sericopeza (Zeller, 1839)
Ectoedemia septembrella (Stainton, 1849)
Ectoedemia viridissimella (Caradja, 1920)
Ectoedemia weaveri (Stainton, 1855)
Ectoedemia amani Svensson, 1966
Ectoedemia atrifrontella (Stainton, 1851)
Ectoedemia liebwerdella Zimmermann, 1940
Ectoedemia longicaudella Klimesch, 1953
Ectoedemia reichli Z. & A. Lastuvka, 1998
Enteucha acetosae (Stainton, 1854)
Parafomoria helianthemella (Herrich-Schäffer, 1860)
Stigmella aceris (Frey, 1857)
Stigmella aeneofasciella (Herrich-Schäffer, 1855)
Stigmella alnetella (Stainton, 1856)
Stigmella anomalella (Goeze, 1783)
Stigmella assimilella (Zeller, 1848)
Stigmella atricapitella (Haworth, 1828)
Stigmella aurella (Fabricius, 1775)
Stigmella basiguttella (Heinemann, 1862)
Stigmella betulicola (Stainton, 1856)
Stigmella carpinella (Heinemann, 1862)
Stigmella catharticella (Stainton, 1853)
Stigmella centifoliella (Zeller, 1848)
Stigmella confusella (Wood & Walsingham, 1894)
Stigmella continuella (Stainton, 1856)
Stigmella crataegella (Klimesch, 1936)
Stigmella desperatella (Frey, 1856)
Stigmella dorsiguttella (Johansson, 1971)
Stigmella eberhardi (Johansson, 1971)
Stigmella filipendulae (Wocke, 1871)
Stigmella floslactella (Haworth, 1828)
Stigmella freyella (Heyden, 1858)
Stigmella glutinosae (Stainton, 1858)
Stigmella hahniella (Worz, 1937)
Stigmella hemargyrella (Kollar, 1832)
Stigmella hybnerella (Hübner, 1796)
Stigmella incognitella (Herrich-Schäffer, 1855)
Stigmella lapponica (Wocke, 1862)
Stigmella lediella (Schleich, 1867)
Stigmella lemniscella (Zeller, 1839)
Stigmella lonicerarum (Frey, 1856)
Stigmella luteella (Stainton, 1857)
Stigmella magdalenae (Klimesch, 1950)
Stigmella malella (Stainton, 1854)
Stigmella mespilicola (Frey, 1856)
Stigmella microtheriella (Stainton, 1854)
Stigmella minusculella (Herrich-Schäffer, 1855)
Stigmella myrtillella (Stainton, 1857)
Stigmella naturnella (Klimesch, 1936)
Stigmella nivenburgensis (Preissecker, 1942)
Stigmella nylandriella (Tengstrom, 1848)
Stigmella obliquella (Heinemann, 1862)
Stigmella oxyacanthella (Stainton, 1854)
Stigmella pallidiciliella Klimesch, 1946
Stigmella paradoxa (Frey, 1858)
Stigmella perpygmaeella (Doubleday, 1859)
Stigmella plagicolella (Stainton, 1854)
Stigmella poterii (Stainton, 1857)
Stigmella pretiosa (Heinemann, 1862)
Stigmella prunetorum (Stainton, 1855)
Stigmella pyri (Glitz, 1865)
Stigmella regiella (Herrich-Schäffer, 1855)
Stigmella rhamnella (Herrich-Schäffer, 1860)
Stigmella roborella (Johansson, 1971)
Stigmella rolandi van Nieukerken, 1990
Stigmella ruficapitella (Haworth, 1828)
Stigmella sakhalinella Puplesis, 1984
Stigmella salicis (Stainton, 1854)
Stigmella samiatella (Zeller, 1839)
Stigmella sanguisorbae (Wocke, 1865)
Stigmella sorbi (Stainton, 1861)
Stigmella speciosa (Frey, 1858)
Stigmella splendidissimella (Herrich-Schäffer, 1855)
Stigmella stettinensis (Heinemann, 1871)
Stigmella szoecsiella (Borkowski, 1972)
Stigmella thuringiaca (Petry, 1904)
Stigmella tiliae (Frey, 1856)
Stigmella tityrella (Stainton, 1854)
Stigmella tormentillella (Herrich-Schäffer, 1860)
Stigmella trimaculella (Haworth, 1828)
Stigmella ulmiphaga (Preissecker, 1942)
Stigmella ulmivora (Fologne, 1860)
Stigmella vimineticola (Frey, 1856)
Stigmella viscerella (Stainton, 1853)
Stigmella zangherii (Klimesch, 1951)
Stigmella zelleriella (Snellen, 1875)
Trifurcula headleyella (Stainton, 1854)
Trifurcula melanoptera van Nieukerken & Puplesis, 1991
Trifurcula thymi (Szocs, 1965)
Trifurcula cryptella (Stainton, 1856)
Trifurcula eurema (Tutt, 1899)
Trifurcula austriaca van Nieukerken, 1990
Trifurcula beirnei Puplesis, 1984
Trifurcula chamaecytisi Z. & A. Lastuvka, 1994
Trifurcula corothamni Z. & A. Lastuvka, 1994
Trifurcula immundella (Zeller, 1839)
Trifurcula josefklimeschi van Nieukerken, 1990
Trifurcula moravica Z. & A. Lastuvka, 1994
Trifurcula pallidella (Duponchel, 1843)
Trifurcula serotinella Herrich-Schäffer, 1855
Trifurcula silviae van Nieukerken, 1990
Trifurcula subnitidella (Duponchel, 1843)

Noctuidae
Abrostola asclepiadis (Denis & Schiffermüller, 1775)
Abrostola tripartita (Hufnagel, 1766)
Abrostola triplasia (Linnaeus, 1758)
Acontia lucida (Hufnagel, 1766)
Acontia trabealis (Scopoli, 1763)
Acosmetia caliginosa (Hübner, 1813)
Acronicta aceris (Linnaeus, 1758)
Acronicta leporina (Linnaeus, 1758)
Acronicta strigosa (Denis & Schiffermüller, 1775)
Acronicta alni (Linnaeus, 1767)
Acronicta cuspis (Hübner, 1813)
Acronicta psi (Linnaeus, 1758)
Acronicta tridens (Denis & Schiffermüller, 1775)
Acronicta auricoma (Denis & Schiffermüller, 1775)
Acronicta euphorbiae (Denis & Schiffermüller, 1775)
Acronicta menyanthidis (Esper, 1789)
Acronicta rumicis (Linnaeus, 1758)
Actebia praecox (Linnaeus, 1758)
Actebia fugax (Treitschke, 1825)
Actinotia polyodon (Clerck, 1759)
Actinotia radiosa (Esper, 1804)
Aedia funesta (Esper, 1786)
Aedia leucomelas (Linnaeus, 1758)
Aegle kaekeritziana (Hübner, 1799)
Agrochola lychnidis (Denis & Schiffermüller, 1775)
Agrochola helvola (Linnaeus, 1758)
Agrochola humilis (Denis & Schiffermüller, 1775)
Agrochola litura (Linnaeus, 1758)
Agrochola nitida (Denis & Schiffermüller, 1775)
Agrochola lota (Clerck, 1759)
Agrochola macilenta (Hübner, 1809)
Agrochola laevis (Hübner, 1803)
Agrochola circellaris (Hufnagel, 1766)
Agrotis bigramma (Esper, 1790)
Agrotis cinerea (Denis & Schiffermüller, 1775)
Agrotis clavis (Hufnagel, 1766)
Agrotis desertorum Boisduval, 1840
Agrotis exclamationis (Linnaeus, 1758)
Agrotis ipsilon (Hufnagel, 1766)
Agrotis puta (Hübner, 1803)
Agrotis segetum (Denis & Schiffermüller, 1775)
Agrotis vestigialis (Hufnagel, 1766)
Allophyes oxyacanthae (Linnaeus, 1758)
Ammoconia caecimacula (Denis & Schiffermüller, 1775)
Amphipoea fucosa (Freyer, 1830)
Amphipoea lucens (Freyer, 1845)
Amphipoea oculea (Linnaeus, 1761)
Amphipyra berbera Rungs, 1949
Amphipyra livida (Denis & Schiffermüller, 1775)
Amphipyra perflua (Fabricius, 1787)
Amphipyra pyramidea (Linnaeus, 1758)
Amphipyra tetra (Fabricius, 1787)
Amphipyra tragopoginis (Clerck, 1759)
Anaplectoides prasina (Denis & Schiffermüller, 1775)
Anarta myrtilli (Linnaeus, 1761)
Anarta odontites (Boisduval, 1829)
Anarta trifolii (Hufnagel, 1766)
Anorthoa munda (Denis & Schiffermüller, 1775)
Antitype chi (Linnaeus, 1758)
Apamea anceps (Denis & Schiffermüller, 1775)
Apamea crenata (Hufnagel, 1766)
Apamea epomidion (Haworth, 1809)
Apamea furva (Denis & Schiffermüller, 1775)
Apamea illyria Freyer, 1846
Apamea lateritia (Hufnagel, 1766)
Apamea lithoxylaea (Denis & Schiffermüller, 1775)
Apamea maillardi (Geyer, 1834)
Apamea monoglypha (Hufnagel, 1766)
Apamea oblonga (Haworth, 1809)
Apamea platinea (Treitschke, 1825)
Apamea remissa (Hübner, 1809)
Apamea rubrirena (Treitschke, 1825)
Apamea scolopacina (Esper, 1788)
Apamea sordens (Hufnagel, 1766)
Apamea sublustris (Esper, 1788)
Apamea syriaca (Osthelder, 1933)
Apamea unanimis (Hübner, 1813)
Aporophyla lutulenta (Denis & Schiffermüller, 1775)
Apterogenum ypsillon (Denis & Schiffermüller, 1775)
Archanara dissoluta (Treitschke, 1825)
Archanara neurica (Hübner, 1808)
Arenostola phragmitidis (Hübner, 1803)
Asteroscopus sphinx (Hufnagel, 1766)
Atethmia ambusta (Denis & Schiffermüller, 1775)
Atethmia centrago (Haworth, 1809)
Athetis furvula (Hübner, 1808)
Athetis gluteosa (Treitschke, 1835)
Athetis pallustris (Hübner, 1808)
Athetis lepigone (Moschler, 1860)
Atypha pulmonaris (Esper, 1790)
Auchmis detersa (Esper, 1787)
Autographa bractea (Denis & Schiffermüller, 1775)
Autographa buraetica (Staudinger, 1892)
Autographa gamma (Linnaeus, 1758)
Autographa jota (Linnaeus, 1758)
Autographa pulchrina (Haworth, 1809)
Axylia putris (Linnaeus, 1761)
Blepharita amica (Treitschke, 1825)
Brachionycha nubeculosa (Esper, 1785)
Brachylomia viminalis (Fabricius, 1776)
Bryophila ereptricula Treitschke, 1825
Bryophila raptricula (Denis & Schiffermüller, 1775)
Bryophila domestica (Hufnagel, 1766)
Calamia tridens (Hufnagel, 1766)
Calliergis ramosa (Esper, 1786)
Callopistria juventina (Stoll, 1782)
Calophasia lunula (Hufnagel, 1766)
Caradrina morpheus (Hufnagel, 1766)
Caradrina gilva (Donzel, 1837)
Caradrina clavipalpis Scopoli, 1763
Caradrina selini Boisduval, 1840
Caradrina aspersa Rambur, 1834
Caradrina kadenii Freyer, 1836
Caradrina montana Bremer, 1861
Caradrina terrea Freyer, 1840
Celaena haworthii (Curtis, 1829)
Ceramica pisi (Linnaeus, 1758)
Cerapteryx graminis (Linnaeus, 1758)
Cerastis leucographa (Denis & Schiffermüller, 1775)
Cerastis rubricosa (Denis & Schiffermüller, 1775)
Charanyca trigrammica (Hufnagel, 1766)
Charanyca ferruginea (Esper, 1785)
Chersotis cuprea (Denis & Schiffermüller, 1775)
Chersotis margaritacea (Villers, 1789)
Chersotis multangula (Hübner, 1803)
Chersotis rectangula (Denis & Schiffermüller, 1775)
Chilodes maritima (Tauscher, 1806)
Chloantha hyperici (Denis & Schiffermüller, 1775)
Chrysodeixis chalcites (Esper, 1789)
Cleoceris scoriacea (Esper, 1789)
Coenophila subrosea (Stephens, 1829)
Colocasia coryli (Linnaeus, 1758)
Conisania leineri (Freyer, 1836)
Conisania luteago (Denis & Schiffermüller, 1775)
Conistra ligula (Esper, 1791)
Conistra rubiginosa (Scopoli, 1763)
Conistra vaccinii (Linnaeus, 1761)
Conistra erythrocephala (Denis & Schiffermüller, 1775)
Conistra rubiginea (Denis & Schiffermüller, 1775)
Coranarta cordigera (Thunberg, 1788)
Cosmia trapezina (Linnaeus, 1758)
Cosmia diffinis (Linnaeus, 1767)
Cosmia pyralina (Denis & Schiffermüller, 1775)
Cosmia affinis (Linnaeus, 1767)
Craniophora ligustri (Denis & Schiffermüller, 1775)
Cryphia fraudatricula (Hübner, 1803)
Cryphia receptricula (Hübner, 1803)
Cryphia algae (Fabricius, 1775)
Crypsedra gemmea (Treitschke, 1825)
Cucullia absinthii (Linnaeus, 1761)
Cucullia argentea (Hufnagel, 1766)
Cucullia artemisiae (Hufnagel, 1766)
Cucullia asteris (Denis & Schiffermüller, 1775)
Cucullia balsamitae Boisduval, 1840
Cucullia campanulae Freyer, 1831
Cucullia chamomillae (Denis & Schiffermüller, 1775)
Cucullia fraudatrix Eversmann, 1837
Cucullia lactucae (Denis & Schiffermüller, 1775)
Cucullia lucifuga (Denis & Schiffermüller, 1775)
Cucullia scopariae Dorfmeister, 1853
Cucullia tanaceti (Denis & Schiffermüller, 1775)
Cucullia umbratica (Linnaeus, 1758)
Cucullia gozmanyi (G. Ronkay & L. Ronkay, 1994)
Cucullia lanceolata (Villers, 1789)
Cucullia lychnitis Rambur, 1833
Cucullia prenanthis Boisduval, 1840
Cucullia scrophulariae (Denis & Schiffermüller, 1775)
Cucullia verbasci (Linnaeus, 1758)
Dasypolia templi (Thunberg, 1792)
Deltote bankiana (Fabricius, 1775)
Deltote deceptoria (Scopoli, 1763)
Deltote uncula (Clerck, 1759)
Deltote pygarga (Hufnagel, 1766)
Denticucullus pygmina (Haworth, 1809)
Diachrysia chrysitis (Linnaeus, 1758)
Diachrysia chryson (Esper, 1789)
Diachrysia stenochrysis (Warren, 1913)
Diachrysia zosimi (Hübner, 1822)
Diarsia brunnea (Denis & Schiffermüller, 1775)
Diarsia dahlii (Hübner, 1813)
Diarsia florida (F. Schmidt, 1859)
Diarsia mendica (Fabricius, 1775)
Diarsia rubi (Vieweg, 1790)
Dichagyris flammatra (Denis & Schiffermüller, 1775)
Dichagyris musiva (Hübner, 1803)
Dichagyris candelisequa (Denis & Schiffermüller, 1775)
Dichagyris forcipula (Denis & Schiffermüller, 1775)
Dichagyris nigrescens (Hofner, 1888)
Dichagyris signifera (Denis & Schiffermüller, 1775)
Dichonia convergens (Denis & Schiffermüller, 1775)
Dicycla oo (Linnaeus, 1758)
Diloba caeruleocephala (Linnaeus, 1758)
Dryobotodes eremita (Fabricius, 1775)
Dryobotodes monochroma (Esper, 1790)
Dypterygia scabriuscula (Linnaeus, 1758)
Egira conspicillaris (Linnaeus, 1758)
Elaphria venustula (Hübner, 1790)
Enargia paleacea (Esper, 1788)
Epilecta linogrisea (Denis & Schiffermüller, 1775)
Epipsilia grisescens (Fabricius, 1794)
Epipsilia latens (Hübner, 1809)
Episema glaucina (Esper, 1789)
Episema tersa (Denis & Schiffermüller, 1775)
Eremobia ochroleuca (Denis & Schiffermüller, 1775)
Eucarta virgo (Treitschke, 1835)
Euchalcia consona (Fabricius, 1787)
Euchalcia modestoides Poole, 1989
Euchalcia variabilis (Piller, 1783)
Eugnorisma glareosa (Esper, 1788)
Eugnorisma depuncta (Linnaeus, 1761)
Eugraphe sigma (Denis & Schiffermüller, 1775)
Euplexia lucipara (Linnaeus, 1758)
Eupsilia transversa (Hufnagel, 1766)
Eurois occulta (Linnaeus, 1758)
Euxoa aquilina (Denis & Schiffermüller, 1775)
Euxoa birivia (Denis & Schiffermüller, 1775)
Euxoa decora (Denis & Schiffermüller, 1775)
Euxoa distinguenda (Lederer, 1857)
Euxoa eruta (Hübner, 1817)
Euxoa nigricans (Linnaeus, 1761)
Euxoa nigrofusca (Esper, 1788)
Euxoa obelisca (Denis & Schiffermüller, 1775)
Euxoa recussa (Hübner, 1817)
Euxoa temera (Hübner, 1808)
Euxoa tritici (Linnaeus, 1761)
Euxoa vitta (Esper, 1789)
Fabula zollikoferi (Freyer, 1836)
Globia algae (Esper, 1789)
Globia sparganii (Esper, 1790)
Gortyna flavago (Denis & Schiffermüller, 1775)
Graphiphora augur (Fabricius, 1775)
Griposia aprilina (Linnaeus, 1758)
Hada plebeja (Linnaeus, 1761)
Hadena irregularis (Hufnagel, 1766)
Hadena perplexa (Denis & Schiffermüller, 1775)
Hadena albimacula (Borkhausen, 1792)
Hadena capsincola (Denis & Schiffermüller, 1775)
Hadena compta (Denis & Schiffermüller, 1775)
Hadena confusa (Hufnagel, 1766)
Hadena filograna (Esper, 1788)
Hecatera bicolorata (Hufnagel, 1766)
Hecatera cappa (Hübner, 1809)
Hecatera dysodea (Denis & Schiffermüller, 1775)
Helicoverpa armigera (Hübner, 1808)
Heliothis adaucta Butler, 1878
Heliothis maritima Graslin, 1855
Heliothis ononis (Denis & Schiffermüller, 1775)
Heliothis peltigera (Denis & Schiffermüller, 1775)
Heliothis viriplaca (Hufnagel, 1766)
Helotropha leucostigma (Hübner, 1808)
Hoplodrina ambigua (Denis & Schiffermüller, 1775)
Hoplodrina blanda (Denis & Schiffermüller, 1775)
Hoplodrina octogenaria (Goeze, 1781)
Hoplodrina respersa (Denis & Schiffermüller, 1775)
Hoplodrina superstes (Ochsenheimer, 1816)
Hydraecia micacea (Esper, 1789)
Hydraecia petasitis Doubleday, 1847
Hydraecia ultima Holst, 1965
Hyppa rectilinea (Esper, 1788)
Hyssia cavernosa (Eversmann, 1842)
Ipimorpha retusa (Linnaeus, 1761)
Ipimorpha subtusa (Denis & Schiffermüller, 1775)
Jodia croceago (Denis & Schiffermüller, 1775)
Lacanobia contigua (Denis & Schiffermüller, 1775)
Lacanobia suasa (Denis & Schiffermüller, 1775)
Lacanobia thalassina (Hufnagel, 1766)
Lacanobia aliena (Hübner, 1809)
Lacanobia oleracea (Linnaeus, 1758)
Lacanobia splendens (Hübner, 1808)
Lacanobia w-latinum (Hufnagel, 1766)
Lamprosticta culta (Denis & Schiffermüller, 1775)
Lamprotes c-aureum (Knoch, 1781)
Lasionycta imbecilla (Fabricius, 1794)
Lasionycta proxima (Hübner, 1809)
Lateroligia ophiogramma (Esper, 1794)
Lenisa geminipuncta (Haworth, 1809)
Leucania comma (Linnaeus, 1761)
Leucania obsoleta (Hübner, 1803)
Lithophane consocia (Borkhausen, 1792)
Lithophane furcifera (Hufnagel, 1766)
Lithophane lamda (Fabricius, 1787)
Lithophane ornitopus (Hufnagel, 1766)
Lithophane semibrunnea (Haworth, 1809)
Lithophane socia (Hufnagel, 1766)
Litoligia literosa (Haworth, 1809)
Luperina nickerlii (Freyer, 1845)
Luperina testacea (Denis & Schiffermüller, 1775)
Lycophotia molothina (Esper, 1789)
Lycophotia porphyrea (Denis & Schiffermüller, 1775)
Macdunnoughia confusa (Stephens, 1850)
Mamestra brassicae (Linnaeus, 1758)
Meganephria bimaculosa (Linnaeus, 1767)
Melanchra persicariae (Linnaeus, 1761)
Mesapamea remmi Rezbanyai-Reser, 1985
Mesapamea secalella Remm, 1983
Mesapamea secalis (Linnaeus, 1758)
Mesogona acetosellae (Denis & Schiffermüller, 1775)
Mesogona oxalina (Hübner, 1803)
Mesoligia furuncula (Denis & Schiffermüller, 1775)
Mniotype adusta (Esper, 1790)
Mniotype satura (Denis & Schiffermüller, 1775)
Moma alpium (Osbeck, 1778)
Mormo maura (Linnaeus, 1758)
Mythimna albipuncta (Denis & Schiffermüller, 1775)
Mythimna ferrago (Fabricius, 1787)
Mythimna l-album (Linnaeus, 1767)
Mythimna conigera (Denis & Schiffermüller, 1775)
Mythimna impura (Hübner, 1808)
Mythimna pallens (Linnaeus, 1758)
Mythimna pudorina (Denis & Schiffermüller, 1775)
Mythimna straminea (Treitschke, 1825)
Mythimna turca (Linnaeus, 1761)
Mythimna vitellina (Hübner, 1808)
Mythimna unipuncta (Haworth, 1809)
Mythimna andereggii (Boisduval, 1840)
Mythimna sicula (Treitschke, 1835)
Naenia typica (Linnaeus, 1758)
Noctua comes Hübner, 1813
Noctua fimbriata (Schreber, 1759)
Noctua interjecta Hübner, 1803
Noctua interposita (Hübner, 1790)
Noctua janthe (Borkhausen, 1792)
Noctua janthina Denis & Schiffermüller, 1775
Noctua orbona (Hufnagel, 1766)
Noctua pronuba (Linnaeus, 1758)
Nonagria typhae (Thunberg, 1784)
Ochropleura plecta (Linnaeus, 1761)
Oligia fasciuncula (Haworth, 1809)
Oligia latruncula (Denis & Schiffermüller, 1775)
Oligia strigilis (Linnaeus, 1758)
Oligia versicolor (Borkhausen, 1792)
Omphalophana antirrhinii (Hübner, 1803)
Opigena polygona (Denis & Schiffermüller, 1775)
Oria musculosa (Hübner, 1808)
Orthosia gracilis (Denis & Schiffermüller, 1775)
Orthosia opima (Hübner, 1809)
Orthosia cerasi (Fabricius, 1775)
Orthosia cruda (Denis & Schiffermüller, 1775)
Orthosia miniosa (Denis & Schiffermüller, 1775)
Orthosia populeti (Fabricius, 1775)
Orthosia incerta (Hufnagel, 1766)
Orthosia gothica (Linnaeus, 1758)
Pabulatrix pabulatricula (Brahm, 1791)
Pachetra sagittigera (Hufnagel, 1766)
Panchrysia aurea (Hübner, 1803)
Panemeria tenebrata (Scopoli, 1763)
Panolis flammea (Denis & Schiffermüller, 1775)
Panthea coenobita (Esper, 1785)
Papestra biren (Goeze, 1781)
Parastichtis suspecta (Hübner, 1817)
Peridroma saucia (Hübner, 1808)
Perigrapha i-cinctum (Denis & Schiffermüller, 1775)
Periphanes delphinii (Linnaeus, 1758)
Phlogophora meticulosa (Linnaeus, 1758)
Phlogophora scita (Hübner, 1790)
Photedes captiuncula (Treitschke, 1825)
Photedes extrema (Hübner, 1809)
Photedes fluxa (Hübner, 1809)
Photedes minima (Haworth, 1809)
Photedes morrisii (Dale, 1837)
Phragmatiphila nexa (Hübner, 1808)
Phyllophila obliterata (Rambur, 1833)
Plusia festucae (Linnaeus, 1758)
Plusia putnami (Grote, 1873)
Polia bombycina (Hufnagel, 1766)
Polia hepatica (Clerck, 1759)
Polia nebulosa (Hufnagel, 1766)
Polia serratilinea Ochsenheimer, 1816
Polychrysia moneta (Fabricius, 1787)
Polymixis flavicincta (Denis & Schiffermüller, 1775)
Polymixis polymita (Linnaeus, 1761)
Polymixis xanthomista (Hübner, 1819)
Polyphaenis sericata (Esper, 1787)
Protolampra sobrina (Duponchel, 1843)
Protoschinia scutosa (Denis & Schiffermüller, 1775)
Pseudeustrotia candidula (Denis & Schiffermüller, 1775)
Pyrrhia purpura (Hübner, 1817)
Pyrrhia umbra (Hufnagel, 1766)
Rhizedra lutosa (Hübner, 1803)
Rhyacia lucipeta (Denis & Schiffermüller, 1775)
Rhyacia simulans (Hufnagel, 1766)
Schinia cardui (Hübner, 1790)
Schinia cognata (Freyer, 1833)
Scotochrosta pulla (Denis & Schiffermüller, 1775)
Sedina buettneri (E. Hering, 1858)
Sideridis rivularis (Fabricius, 1775)
Sideridis kitti (Schawerda, 1914)
Sideridis reticulata (Goeze, 1781)
Sideridis lampra (Schawerda, 1913)
Sideridis turbida (Esper, 1790)
Simyra albovenosa (Goeze, 1781)
Simyra nervosa (Denis & Schiffermüller, 1775)
Spaelotis ravida (Denis & Schiffermüller, 1775)
Spodoptera exigua (Hübner, 1808)
Staurophora celsia (Linnaeus, 1758)
Subacronicta megacephala (Denis & Schiffermüller, 1775)
Syngrapha ain (Hochenwarth, 1785)
Syngrapha interrogationis (Linnaeus, 1758)
Thalpophila matura (Hufnagel, 1766)
Tholera cespitis (Denis & Schiffermüller, 1775)
Tholera decimalis (Poda, 1761)
Tiliacea aurago (Denis & Schiffermüller, 1775)
Tiliacea citrago (Linnaeus, 1758)
Tiliacea sulphurago (Denis & Schiffermüller, 1775)
Trachea atriplicis (Linnaeus, 1758)
Trichoplusia ni (Hübner, 1803)
Trichosea ludifica (Linnaeus, 1758)
Tyta luctuosa (Denis & Schiffermüller, 1775)
Valeria oleagina (Denis & Schiffermüller, 1775)
Xanthia gilvago (Denis & Schiffermüller, 1775)
Xanthia icteritia (Hufnagel, 1766)
Xanthia ocellaris (Borkhausen, 1792)
Xanthia ruticilla (Esper, 1791)
Xanthia togata (Esper, 1788)
Xestia ashworthii (Doubleday, 1855)
Xestia c-nigrum (Linnaeus, 1758)
Xestia ditrapezium (Denis & Schiffermüller, 1775)
Xestia triangulum (Hufnagel, 1766)
Xestia alpicola (Zetterstedt, 1839)
Xestia rhaetica (Staudinger, 1871)
Xestia sincera (Herrich-Schäffer, 1851)
Xestia speciosa (Hübner, 1813)
Xestia agathina (Duponchel, 1827)
Xestia baja (Denis & Schiffermüller, 1775)
Xestia castanea (Esper, 1798)
Xestia collina (Boisduval, 1840)
Xestia sexstrigata (Haworth, 1809)
Xestia stigmatica (Hübner, 1813)
Xestia xanthographa (Denis & Schiffermüller, 1775)
Xylena solidaginis (Hübner, 1803)
Xylena exsoleta (Linnaeus, 1758)
Xylena vetusta (Hübner, 1813)

Nolidae
Bena bicolorana (Fuessly, 1775)
Earias clorana (Linnaeus, 1761)
Earias vernana (Fabricius, 1787)
Meganola albula (Denis & Schiffermüller, 1775)
Meganola kolbi (Daniel, 1935)
Meganola strigula (Denis & Schiffermüller, 1775)
Meganola togatulalis (Hübner, 1796)
Nola aerugula (Hübner, 1793)
Nola cicatricalis (Treitschke, 1835)
Nola confusalis (Herrich-Schäffer, 1847)
Nola cristatula (Hübner, 1793)
Nola cucullatella (Linnaeus, 1758)
Nycteola asiatica (Krulikovsky, 1904)
Nycteola degenerana (Hübner, 1799)
Nycteola revayana (Scopoli, 1772)
Nycteola siculana (Fuchs, 1899)
Pseudoips prasinana (Linnaeus, 1758)

Notodontidae
Cerura erminea (Esper, 1783)
Cerura vinula (Linnaeus, 1758)
Clostera anachoreta (Denis & Schiffermüller, 1775)
Clostera anastomosis (Linnaeus, 1758)
Clostera curtula (Linnaeus, 1758)
Clostera pigra (Hufnagel, 1766)
Dicranura ulmi (Denis & Schiffermüller, 1775)
Drymonia dodonaea (Denis & Schiffermüller, 1775)
Drymonia obliterata (Esper, 1785)
Drymonia querna (Denis & Schiffermüller, 1775)
Drymonia ruficornis (Hufnagel, 1766)
Drymonia velitaris (Hufnagel, 1766)
Furcula bicuspis (Borkhausen, 1790)
Furcula bifida (Brahm, 1787)
Furcula furcula (Clerck, 1759)
Gluphisia crenata (Esper, 1785)
Harpyia milhauseri (Fabricius, 1775)
Leucodonta bicoloria (Denis & Schiffermüller, 1775)
Notodonta dromedarius (Linnaeus, 1767)
Notodonta torva (Hübner, 1803)
Notodonta tritophus (Denis & Schiffermüller, 1775)
Notodonta ziczac (Linnaeus, 1758)
Odontosia carmelita (Esper, 1799)
Odontosia sieversii (Menetries, 1856)
Peridea anceps (Goeze, 1781)
Phalera bucephala (Linnaeus, 1758)
Phalera bucephaloides (Ochsenheimer, 1810)
Pheosia gnoma (Fabricius, 1776)
Pheosia tremula (Clerck, 1759)
Pterostoma palpina (Clerck, 1759)
Ptilodon capucina (Linnaeus, 1758)
Ptilodon cucullina (Denis & Schiffermüller, 1775)
Ptilophora plumigera (Denis & Schiffermüller, 1775)
Pygaera timon (Hübner, 1803)
Spatalia argentina (Denis & Schiffermüller, 1775)
Stauropus fagi (Linnaeus, 1758)
Thaumetopoea pinivora (Treitschke, 1834)
Thaumetopoea processionea (Linnaeus, 1758)

Oecophoridae
Alabonia staintoniella (Zeller, 1850)
Aplota nigricans (Zeller, 1852)
Aplota palpella (Haworth, 1828)
Batia internella Jackh, 1972
Batia lambdella (Donovan, 1793)
Bisigna procerella (Denis & Schiffermüller, 1775)
Borkhausenia fuscescens (Haworth, 1828)
Borkhausenia luridicomella (Herrich-Schäffer, 1856)
Borkhausenia minutella (Linnaeus, 1758)
Crassa tinctella (Hübner, 1796)
Crassa unitella (Hübner, 1796)
Dasycera oliviella (Fabricius, 1794)
Decantha borkhausenii (Zeller, 1839)
Denisia albimaculea (Haworth, 1828)
Denisia augustella (Hübner, 1796)
Denisia nubilosella (Herrich-Schäffer, 1854)
Denisia similella (Hübner, 1796)
Denisia stipella (Linnaeus, 1758)
Denisia stroemella (Fabricius, 1779)
Deuterogonia pudorina (Wocke, 1857)
Endrosis sarcitrella (Linnaeus, 1758)
Epicallima bruandella (Ragonot, 1889)
Epicallima formosella (Denis & Schiffermüller, 1775)
Fabiola pokornyi (Nickerl, 1864)
Harpella forficella (Scopoli, 1763)
Hofmannophila pseudospretella (Stainton, 1849)
Holoscolia huebneri Kocak, 1980
Metalampra cinnamomea (Zeller, 1839)
Minetia criella (Treitschke, 1835)
Minetia crinitus (Fabricius, 1798)
Minetia labiosella (Hübner, 1810)
Oecophora bractella (Linnaeus, 1758)
Pleurota marginella (Denis & Schiffermüller, 1775)
Pleurota aristella (Linnaeus, 1767)
Pleurota bicostella (Clerck, 1759)
Pleurota proteella Staudinger, 1880
Pleurota pyropella (Denis & Schiffermüller, 1775)
Schiffermuelleria schaefferella (Linnaeus, 1758)
Schiffermuelleria grandis (Desvignes, 1842)

Opostegidae
Opostega salaciella (Treitschke, 1833)
Opostega spatulella Herrich-Schäffer, 1855
Pseudopostega auritella (Hübner, 1813)
Pseudopostega crepusculella (Zeller, 1839)

Peleopodidae
Carcina quercana (Fabricius, 1775)

Plutellidae
Eidophasia messingiella (Fischer von Röslerstamm, 1840)
Plutella xylostella (Linnaeus, 1758)
Plutella porrectella (Linnaeus, 1758)
Rhigognostis annulatella (Curtis, 1832)
Rhigognostis hufnagelii (Zeller, 1839)
Rhigognostis incarnatella (Steudel, 1873)
Rhigognostis senilella (Zetterstedt, 1839)

Praydidae
Atemelia torquatella (Lienig & Zeller, 1846)
Prays fraxinella (Bjerkander, 1784)
Prays ruficeps (Heinemann, 1854)

Prodoxidae
Lampronia capitella (Clerck, 1759)
Lampronia corticella (Linnaeus, 1758)
Lampronia flavimitrella (Hübner, 1817)
Lampronia fuscatella (Tengstrom, 1848)
Lampronia luzella (Hübner, 1817)
Lampronia morosa Zeller, 1852
Lampronia provectella (Heyden, 1865)
Lampronia redimitella (Lienig & Zeller, 1846)
Lampronia rupella (Denis & Schiffermüller, 1775)

Psychidae
Acanthopsyche atra (Linnaeus, 1767)
Acentra subvestalis (Wehrli, 1933)
Apterona helicoidella (Vallot, 1827)
Bacotia claustrella (Bruand, 1845)
Bijugis bombycella (Denis & Schiffermüller, 1775)
Bijugis pectinella (Denis & Schiffermüller, 1775)
Canephora hirsuta (Poda, 1761)
Dahlica charlottae (Meier, 1957)
Dahlica lichenella (Linnaeus, 1761)
Dahlica nickerlii (Heinemann, 1870)
Dahlica sauteri (Hattenschwiler, 1977)
Dahlica triquetrella (Hübner, 1813)
Diplodoma laichartingella Goeze, 1783
Eosolenobia manni Zeller, 1852
Epichnopterix kovacsi Sieder, 1955
Epichnopterix plumella (Denis & Schiffermüller, 1775)
Epichnopterix sieboldi (Reutti, 1853)
Eumasia parietariella (Heydenreich, 1851)
Megalophanes stetinensis (E. Hering, 1846)
Megalophanes viciella (Denis & Schiffermüller, 1775)
Narycia astrella (Herrich-Schäffer, 1851)
Narycia duplicella (Goeze, 1783)
Pachythelia villosella (Ochsenheimer, 1810)
Phalacropterix graslinella (Boisduval, 1852)
Praesolenobia clathrella Fischer v. Röslerstamm, 1837
Proutia betulina (Zeller, 1839)
Psyche casta (Pallas, 1767)
Psyche crassiorella Bruand, 1851
Psychidea nudella (Ochsenheimer, 1810)
Ptilocephala muscella (Denis & Schiffermüller, 1775)
Ptilocephala plumifera (Ochsenheimer, 1810)
Rebelia bavarica Wehrli, 1926
Rebelia herrichiella Strand, 1912
Siederia listerella (Linnaeus, 1758)
Sterrhopterix fusca (Haworth, 1809)
Sterrhopterix standfussi (Wocke, 1851)
Taleporia politella (Ochsenheimer, 1816)
Taleporia tubulosa (Retzius, 1783)

Pterolonchidae
Pterolonche inspersa Staudinger, 1859

Pterophoridae
Adaina microdactyla (Hübner, 1813)
Agdistis adactyla (Hübner, 1819)
Amblyptilia acanthadactyla (Hübner, 1813)
Amblyptilia punctidactyla (Haworth, 1811)
Buckleria paludum (Zeller, 1839)
Buszkoiana capnodactylus (Zeller, 1841)
Calyciphora albodactylus (Fabricius, 1794)
Calyciphora homoiodactyla (Kasy, 1960)
Calyciphora nephelodactyla (Eversmann, 1844)
Capperia celeusi (Frey, 1886)
Capperia fusca (O. Hofmann, 1898)
Capperia loranus (Fuchs, 1895)
Capperia trichodactyla (Denis & Schiffermüller, 1775)
Cnaemidophorus rhododactyla (Denis & Schiffermüller, 1775)
Crombrugghia distans (Zeller, 1847)
Crombrugghia tristis (Zeller, 1841)
Emmelina argoteles (Meyrick, 1922)
Emmelina monodactyla (Linnaeus, 1758)
Geina didactyla (Linnaeus, 1758)
Gillmeria ochrodactyla (Denis & Schiffermüller, 1775)
Gillmeria pallidactyla (Haworth, 1811)
Hellinsia carphodactyla (Hübner, 1813)
Hellinsia didactylites (Strom, 1783)
Hellinsia distinctus (Herrich-Schäffer, 1855)
Hellinsia inulae (Zeller, 1852)
Hellinsia lienigianus (Zeller, 1852)
Hellinsia osteodactylus (Zeller, 1841)
Hellinsia tephradactyla (Hübner, 1813)
Marasmarcha lunaedactyla (Haworth, 1811)
Merrifieldia baliodactylus (Zeller, 1841)
Merrifieldia leucodactyla (Denis & Schiffermüller, 1775)
Merrifieldia tridactyla (Linnaeus, 1758)
Oidaematophorus constanti Ragonot, 1875
Oidaematophorus lithodactyla (Treitschke, 1833)
Oxyptilus chrysodactyla (Denis & Schiffermüller, 1775)
Oxyptilus ericetorum (Stainton, 1851)
Oxyptilus parvidactyla (Haworth, 1811)
Oxyptilus pilosellae (Zeller, 1841)
Platyptilia calodactyla (Denis & Schiffermüller, 1775)
Platyptilia farfarellus Zeller, 1867
Platyptilia gonodactyla (Denis & Schiffermüller, 1775)
Platyptilia nemoralis Zeller, 1841
Platyptilia tesseradactyla (Linnaeus, 1761)
Porrittia galactodactyla (Denis & Schiffermüller, 1775)
Pselnophorus heterodactyla (Muller, 1764)
Pterophorus pentadactyla (Linnaeus, 1758)
Stenoptilia annadactyla Sutter, 1988
Stenoptilia bipunctidactyla (Scopoli, 1763)
Stenoptilia coprodactylus (Stainton, 1851)
Stenoptilia graphodactyla (Treitschke, 1833)
Stenoptilia gratiolae Gibeaux & Nel, 1990
Stenoptilia pelidnodactyla (Stein, 1837)
Stenoptilia pterodactyla (Linnaeus, 1761)
Stenoptilia stigmatodactylus (Zeller, 1852)
Stenoptilia zophodactylus (Duponchel, 1840)
Wheeleria obsoletus (Zeller, 1841)

Pyralidae
Achroia grisella (Fabricius, 1794)
Acrobasis advenella (Zincken, 1818)
Acrobasis consociella (Hübner, 1813)
Acrobasis glaucella Staudinger, 1859
Acrobasis legatea (Haworth, 1811)
Acrobasis marmorea (Haworth, 1811)
Acrobasis obtusella (Hübner, 1796)
Acrobasis repandana (Fabricius, 1798)
Acrobasis sodalella Zeller, 1848
Acrobasis suavella (Zincken, 1818)
Acrobasis tumidana (Denis & Schiffermüller, 1775)
Aglossa pinguinalis (Linnaeus, 1758)
Aglossa signicostalis Staudinger, 1871
Ancylosis cinnamomella (Duponchel, 1836)
Ancylosis oblitella (Zeller, 1848)
Ancylosis sareptalla (Herrich-Schäffer, 1861)
Anerastia lotella (Hübner, 1813)
Aphomia foedella (Zeller, 1839)
Aphomia sociella (Linnaeus, 1758)
Aphomia zelleri de Joannis, 1932
Apomyelois bistriatella (Hulst, 1887)
Apomyelois ceratoniae (Zeller, 1839)
Assara terebrella (Zincken, 1818)
Cadra calidella (Guenee, 1845)
Cadra cautella (Walker, 1863)
Cadra figulilella (Gregson, 1871)
Cadra furcatella (Herrich-Schäffer, 1849)
Catastia marginea (Denis & Schiffermüller, 1775)
Corcyra cephalonica (Stainton, 1866)
Cryptoblabes bistriga (Haworth, 1811)
Delplanqueia dilutella (Denis & Schiffermüller, 1775)
Dioryctria abietella (Denis & Schiffermüller, 1775)
Dioryctria schuetzeella Fuchs, 1899
Dioryctria simplicella Heinemann, 1863
Dioryctria sylvestrella (Ratzeburg, 1840)
Eccopisa effractella Zeller, 1848
Elegia fallax (Staudinger, 1881)
Elegia similella (Zincken, 1818)
Ematheudes punctella (Treitschke, 1833)
Endotricha flammealis (Denis & Schiffermüller, 1775)
Ephestia elutella (Hübner, 1796)
Ephestia kuehniella Zeller, 1879
Ephestia unicolorella Staudinger, 1881
Epischnia prodromella (Hübner, 1799)
Episcythrastis tetricella (Denis & Schiffermüller, 1775)
Etiella zinckenella (Treitschke, 1832)
Eurhodope cirrigerella (Zincken, 1818)
Eurhodope rosella (Scopoli, 1763)
Euzophera bigella (Zeller, 1848)
Euzophera cinerosella (Zeller, 1839)
Euzophera fuliginosella (Heinemann, 1865)
Euzophera pinguis (Haworth, 1811)
Euzopherodes charlottae (Rebel, 1914)
Galleria mellonella (Linnaeus, 1758)
Glyptoteles leucacrinella Zeller, 1848
Gymnancyla canella (Denis & Schiffermüller, 1775)
Gymnancyla hornigii (Lederer, 1852)
Homoeosoma inustella Ragonot, 1884
Homoeosoma nebulella (Denis & Schiffermüller, 1775)
Homoeosoma nimbella (Duponchel, 1837)
Homoeosoma sinuella (Fabricius, 1794)
Hypochalcia ahenella (Denis & Schiffermüller, 1775)
Hypochalcia decorella (Hübner, 1810)
Hypochalcia lignella (Hübner, 1796)
Hypsopygia costalis (Fabricius, 1775)
Hypsopygia glaucinalis (Linnaeus, 1758)
Hypsopygia rubidalis (Denis & Schiffermüller, 1775)
Isauria dilucidella (Duponchel, 1836)
Khorassania compositella (Treitschke, 1835)
Lamoria anella (Denis & Schiffermüller, 1775)
Laodamia faecella (Zeller, 1839)
Matilella fusca (Haworth, 1811)
Moitrelia obductella (Zeller, 1839)
Myelois circumvoluta (Fourcroy, 1785)
Nephopterix angustella (Hübner, 1796)
Nyctegretis lineana (Scopoli, 1786)
Nyctegretis triangulella Ragonot, 1901
Oncocera semirubella (Scopoli, 1763)
Ortholepis betulae (Goeze, 1778)
Paralipsa gularis (Zeller, 1877)
Pempelia palumbella (Denis & Schiffermüller, 1775)
Pempeliella ornatella (Denis & Schiffermüller, 1775)
Phycita meliella (Mann, 1864)
Phycita roborella (Denis & Schiffermüller, 1775)
Phycitodes albatella (Ragonot, 1887)
Phycitodes binaevella (Hübner, 1813)
Phycitodes maritima (Tengstrom, 1848)
Phycitodes saxicola (Vaughan, 1870)
Plodia interpunctella (Hübner, 1813)
Pyralis farinalis (Linnaeus, 1758)
Pyralis perversalis (Herrich-Schäffer, 1849)
Pyralis regalis Denis & Schiffermüller, 1775
Rhodophaea formosa (Haworth, 1811)
Salebriopsis albicilla (Herrich-Schäffer, 1849)
Sciota adelphella (Fischer v. Röslerstamm, 1836)
Sciota fumella (Eversmann, 1844)
Sciota hostilis (Stephens, 1834)
Sciota rhenella (Zincken, 1818)
Selagia argyrella (Denis & Schiffermüller, 1775)
Selagia spadicella (Hübner, 1796)
Stemmatophora brunnealis (Treitschke, 1829)
Synaphe antennalis (Fabricius, 1794)
Synaphe bombycalis (Denis & Schiffermüller, 1775)
Synaphe punctalis (Fabricius, 1775)
Trachonitis cristella (Denis & Schiffermüller, 1775)
Vitula biviella (Zeller, 1848)
Zophodia grossulariella (Hübner, 1809)

Roeslerstammiidae
Roeslerstammia erxlebella (Fabricius, 1787)
Roeslerstammia pronubella (Denis & Schiffermüller, 1775)

Saturniidae
Aglia tau (Linnaeus, 1758)

Saturniidae
Saturnia pavonia (Linnaeus, 1758)
Saturnia pavoniella (Scopoli, 1763)
Saturnia spini (Denis & Schiffermüller, 1775)
Saturnia pyri (Denis & Schiffermüller, 1775)

Schreckensteiniidae
Schreckensteinia festaliella (Hübner, 1819)

Scythrididae
Parascythris muelleri (Mann, 1871)
Scythris bengtssoni Patocka & Liska, 1989
Scythris bifissella (O. Hofmann, 1889)
Scythris braschiella (O. Hofmann, 1897)
Scythris cicadella (Zeller, 1839)
Scythris clavella (Zeller, 1855)
Scythris crassiuscula (Herrich-Schäffer, 1855)
Scythris crypta Hannemann, 1961
Scythris cuspidella (Denis & Schiffermüller, 1775)
Scythris disparella (Tengstrom, 1848)
Scythris dissimilella (Herrich-Schäffer, 1855)
Scythris flavidella Preissecker, 1911
Scythris flavilaterella (Fuchs, 1886)
Scythris flaviventrella (Herrich-Schäffer, 1855)
Scythris fuscoaenea (Haworth, 1828)
Scythris inspersella (Hübner, 1817)
Scythris knochella (Fabricius, 1794)
Scythris laminella (Denis & Schiffermüller, 1775)
Scythris limbella (Fabricius, 1775)
Scythris noricella (Zeller, 1843)
Scythris obscurella (Scopoli, 1763)
Scythris palustris (Zeller, 1855)
Scythris paullella (Herrich-Schäffer, 1855)
Scythris picaepennis (Haworth, 1828)
Scythris potentillella (Zeller, 1847)
Scythris productella (Zeller, 1839)
Scythris scopolella (Linnaeus, 1767)
Scythris seliniella (Zeller, 1839)
Scythris siccella (Zeller, 1839)
Scythris tributella (Zeller, 1847)
Scythris vittella (O. Costa, 1834)

Sesiidae
Bembecia albanensis (Rebel, 1918)
Bembecia ichneumoniformis (Denis & Schiffermüller, 1775)
Bembecia megillaeformis (Hübner, 1813)
Bembecia scopigera (Scopoli, 1763)
Chamaesphecia annellata (Zeller, 1847)
Chamaesphecia astatiformis (Herrich-Schäffer, 1846)
Chamaesphecia crassicornis Bartel, 1912
Chamaesphecia doleriformis (Herrich-Schäffer, 1846)
Chamaesphecia dumonti Le Cerf, 1922
Chamaesphecia empiformis (Esper, 1783)
Chamaesphecia euceraeformis (Ochsenheimer, 1816)
Chamaesphecia hungarica (Tomala, 1901)
Chamaesphecia leucopsiformis (Esper, 1800)
Chamaesphecia masariformis (Ochsenheimer, 1808)
Chamaesphecia nigrifrons (Le Cerf, 1911)
Chamaesphecia palustris Kautz, 1927
Chamaesphecia tenthrediniformis (Denis & Schiffermüller, 1775)
Paranthrene insolitus Le Cerf, 1914
Paranthrene tabaniformis (Rottemburg, 1775)
Pennisetia bohemica Kralicek & Povolny, 1974
Pennisetia hylaeiformis (Laspeyres, 1801)
Pyropteron affinis (Staudinger, 1856)
Pyropteron muscaeformis (Esper, 1783)
Pyropteron triannuliformis (Freyer, 1843)
Sesia apiformis (Clerck, 1759)
Sesia bembeciformis (Hübner, 1806)
Sesia melanocephala Dalman, 1816
Synanthedon andrenaeformis (Laspeyres, 1801)
Synanthedon cephiformis (Ochsenheimer, 1808)
Synanthedon conopiformis (Esper, 1782)
Synanthedon culiciformis (Linnaeus, 1758)
Synanthedon flaviventris (Staudinger, 1883)
Synanthedon formicaeformis (Esper, 1783)
Synanthedon loranthi (Kralicek, 1966)
Synanthedon mesiaeformis (Herrich-Schäffer, 1846)
Synanthedon myopaeformis (Borkhausen, 1789)
Synanthedon scoliaeformis (Borkhausen, 1789)
Synanthedon soffneri Spatenka, 1983
Synanthedon spheciformis (Denis & Schiffermüller, 1775)
Synanthedon spuleri (Fuchs, 1908)
Synanthedon stomoxiformis (Hübner, 1790)
Synanthedon tipuliformis (Clerck, 1759)
Synanthedon vespiformis (Linnaeus, 1761)

Sphingidae
Acherontia atropos (Linnaeus, 1758)
Agrius convolvuli (Linnaeus, 1758)
Daphnis nerii (Linnaeus, 1758)
Deilephila elpenor (Linnaeus, 1758)
Deilephila porcellus (Linnaeus, 1758)
Hemaris fuciformis (Linnaeus, 1758)
Hemaris tityus (Linnaeus, 1758)
Hippotion celerio (Linnaeus, 1758)
Hyles euphorbiae (Linnaeus, 1758)
Hyles gallii (Rottemburg, 1775)
Hyles livornica (Esper, 1780)
Hyles vespertilio (Esper, 1780)
Laothoe populi (Linnaeus, 1758)
Macroglossum stellatarum (Linnaeus, 1758)
Marumba quercus (Denis & Schiffermüller, 1775)
Mimas tiliae (Linnaeus, 1758)
Proserpinus proserpina (Pallas, 1772)
Smerinthus ocellata (Linnaeus, 1758)
Sphinx ligustri Linnaeus, 1758
Sphinx pinastri Linnaeus, 1758

Stathmopodidae
Stathmopoda pedella (Linnaeus, 1761)

Thyrididae
Thyris fenestrella (Scopoli, 1763)

Tineidae
Agnathosia mendicella (Denis & Schiffermüller, 1775)
Archinemapogon yildizae Kocak, 1981
Ateliotum hungaricellum Zeller, 1839
Cephimallota angusticostella (Zeller, 1839)
Cephimallota crassiflavella Bruand, 1851
Cephimallota praetoriella (Christoph, 1872)
Elatobia fuliginosella (Lienig & Zeller, 1846)
Eudarcia pagenstecherella (Hübner, 1825)
Eudarcia confusella (Heydenreich, 1851)
Euplocamus anthracinalis (Scopoli, 1763)
Haplotinea ditella (Pierce & Metcalfe, 1938)
Haplotinea insectella (Fabricius, 1794)
Infurcitinea albicomella (Stainton, 1851)
Infurcitinea argentimaculella (Stainton, 1849)
Infurcitinea finalis Gozmany, 1959
Infurcitinea ignicomella (Zeller, 1852)
Infurcitinea roesslerella (Heyden, 1865)
Lichenotinea pustulatella (Zeller, 1852)
Monopis crocicapitella (Clemens, 1859)
Monopis fenestratella (Heyden, 1863)
Monopis imella (Hübner, 1813)
Monopis laevigella (Denis & Schiffermüller, 1775)
Monopis monachella (Hübner, 1796)
Monopis obviella (Denis & Schiffermüller, 1775)
Monopis weaverella (Scott, 1858)
Morophaga choragella (Denis & Schiffermüller, 1775)
Nemapogon clematella (Fabricius, 1781)
Nemapogon cloacella (Haworth, 1828)
Nemapogon falstriella (Bang-Haas, 1881)
Nemapogon fungivorella (Benander, 1939)
Nemapogon gliriella (Heyden, 1865)
Nemapogon granella (Linnaeus, 1758)
Nemapogon gravosaellus Petersen, 1957
Nemapogon inconditella (Lucas, 1956)
Nemapogon nigralbella (Zeller, 1839)
Nemapogon picarella (Clerck, 1759)
Nemapogon quercicolella (Zeller, 1852)
Nemapogon ruricolella (Stainton, 1849)
Nemapogon variatella (Clemens, 1859)
Nemapogon wolffiella Karsholt & Nielsen, 1976
Nemaxera betulinella (Fabricius, 1787)
Neurothaumasia ankerella (Mann, 1867)
Niditinea fuscella (Linnaeus, 1758)
Niditinea striolella (Matsumura, 1931)
Niditinea truncicolella (Tengstrom, 1848)
Opogona sacchari (Bojer, 1856)
Psychoides verhuella Bruand, 1853
Reisserita relicinella (Herrich-Schäffer, 1853)
Scardia boletella (Fabricius, 1794)
Stenoptinea cyaneimarmorella (Milliere, 1854)
Tenaga rhenania (Petersen, 1962)
Tinea columbariella Wocke, 1877
Tinea dubiella Stainton, 1859
Tinea nonimella (Zagulajev, 1955)
Tinea pallescentella Stainton, 1851
Tinea pellionella Linnaeus, 1758
Tinea semifulvella Haworth, 1828
Tinea steueri Petersen, 1966
Tinea translucens Meyrick, 1917
Tinea trinotella Thunberg, 1794
Tineola bisselliella (Hummel, 1823)
Triaxomasia caprimulgella (Stainton, 1851)
Triaxomera fulvimitrella (Sodoffsky, 1830)
Triaxomera parasitella (Hübner, 1796)
Trichophaga tapetzella (Linnaeus, 1758)

Tischeriidae
Coptotriche angusticollella (Duponchel, 1843)
Coptotriche gaunacella (Duponchel, 1843)
Coptotriche heinemanni (Wocke, 1871)
Coptotriche marginea (Haworth, 1828)
Tischeria decidua Wocke, 1876
Tischeria dodonaea Stainton, 1858
Tischeria ekebladella (Bjerkander, 1795)

Tortricidae
Acleris abietana (Hübner, 1822)
Acleris aspersana (Hübner, 1817)
Acleris bergmanniana (Linnaeus, 1758)
Acleris comariana (Lienig & Zeller, 1846)
Acleris cristana (Denis & Schiffermüller, 1775)
Acleris emargana (Fabricius, 1775)
Acleris ferrugana (Denis & Schiffermüller, 1775)
Acleris forsskaleana (Linnaeus, 1758)
Acleris hastiana (Linnaeus, 1758)
Acleris holmiana (Linnaeus, 1758)
Acleris hyemana (Haworth, 1811)
Acleris kochiella (Goeze, 1783)
Acleris laterana (Fabricius, 1794)
Acleris lipsiana (Denis & Schiffermüller, 1775)
Acleris literana (Linnaeus, 1758)
Acleris logiana (Clerck, 1759)
Acleris lorquiniana (Duponchel, 1835)
Acleris maccana (Treitschke, 1835)
Acleris notana (Donovan, 1806)
Acleris permutana (Duponchel, 1836)
Acleris quercinana (Zeller, 1849)
Acleris rhombana (Denis & Schiffermüller, 1775)
Acleris roscidana (Hübner, 1799)
Acleris rufana (Denis & Schiffermüller, 1775)
Acleris scabrana (Denis & Schiffermüller, 1775)
Acleris schalleriana (Linnaeus, 1761)
Acleris shepherdana (Stephens, 1852)
Acleris sparsana (Denis & Schiffermüller, 1775)
Acleris umbrana (Hübner, 1799)
Acleris variegana (Denis & Schiffermüller, 1775)
Adoxophyes orana (Fischer v. Röslerstamm, 1834)
Aethes beatricella (Walsingham, 1898)
Aethes bilbaensis (Rossler, 1877)
Aethes cnicana (Westwood, 1854)
Aethes dilucidana (Stephens, 1852)
Aethes fennicana (M. Hering, 1924)
Aethes flagellana (Duponchel, 1836)
Aethes francillana (Fabricius, 1794)
Aethes hartmanniana (Clerck, 1759)
Aethes kindermanniana (Treitschke, 1830)
Aethes margaritana (Haworth, 1811)
Aethes margarotana (Duponchel, 1836)
Aethes nefandana (Kennel, 1899)
Aethes rubigana (Treitschke, 1830)
Aethes rutilana (Hübner, 1817)
Aethes sanguinana (Treitschke, 1830)
Aethes smeathmanniana (Fabricius, 1781)
Aethes tesserana (Denis & Schiffermüller, 1775)
Aethes triangulana (Treitschke, 1835)
Aethes williana (Brahm, 1791)
Agapeta hamana (Linnaeus, 1758)
Agapeta zoegana (Linnaeus, 1767)
Aleimma loeflingiana (Linnaeus, 1758)
Ancylis achatana (Denis & Schiffermüller, 1775)
Ancylis apicella (Denis & Schiffermüller, 1775)
Ancylis badiana (Denis & Schiffermüller, 1775)
Ancylis comptana (Frolich, 1828)
Ancylis diminutana (Haworth, 1811)
Ancylis geminana (Donovan, 1806)
Ancylis laetana (Fabricius, 1775)
Ancylis mitterbacheriana (Denis & Schiffermüller, 1775)
Ancylis myrtillana (Treitschke, 1830)
Ancylis obtusana (Haworth, 1811)
Ancylis paludana Barrett, 1871
Ancylis selenana (Guenee, 1845)
Ancylis subarcuana (Douglas, 1847)
Ancylis tineana (Hübner, 1799)
Ancylis uncella (Denis & Schiffermüller, 1775)
Ancylis unculana (Haworth, 1811)
Ancylis unguicella (Linnaeus, 1758)
Ancylis upupana (Treitschke, 1835)
Aphelia viburniana (Denis & Schiffermüller, 1775)
Aphelia ferugana (Hübner, 1793)
Aphelia paleana (Hübner, 1793)
Aphelia unitana (Hübner, 1799)
Apotomis betuletana (Haworth, 1811)
Apotomis capreana (Hübner, 1817)
Apotomis fraterculana Krogerus, 1946
Apotomis infida (Heinrich, 1926)
Apotomis inundana (Denis & Schiffermüller, 1775)
Apotomis lineana (Denis & Schiffermüller, 1775)
Apotomis sauciana (Frolich, 1828)
Apotomis semifasciana (Haworth, 1811)
Apotomis sororculana (Zetterstedt, 1839)
Apotomis turbidana Hübner, 1825
Archips betulana (Hübner, 1787)
Archips crataegana (Hübner, 1799)
Archips oporana (Linnaeus, 1758)
Archips podana (Scopoli, 1763)
Archips rosana (Linnaeus, 1758)
Archips xylosteana (Linnaeus, 1758)
Argyroploce arbutella (Linnaeus, 1758)
Argyroploce externa (Eversmann, 1844)
Argyroploce lediana (Linnaeus, 1758)
Argyroploce roseomaculana (Herrich-Schäffer, 1851)
Argyrotaenia ljungiana (Thunberg, 1797)
Aterpia corticana (Denis & Schiffermüller, 1775)
Bactra furfurana (Haworth, 1811)
Bactra lacteana Caradja, 1916
Bactra lancealana (Hübner, 1799)
Barbara herrichiana Obraztsov, 1960
Capua vulgana (Frolich, 1828)
Celypha aurofasciana (Haworth, 1811)
Celypha capreolana (Herrich-Schäffer, 1851)
Celypha cespitana (Hübner, 1817)
Celypha flavipalpana (Herrich-Schäffer, 1851)
Celypha lacunana (Denis & Schiffermüller, 1775)
Celypha rivulana (Scopoli, 1763)
Celypha rufana (Scopoli, 1763)
Celypha rurestrana (Duponchel, 1843)
Celypha siderana (Treitschke, 1835)
Celypha striana (Denis & Schiffermüller, 1775)
Celypha woodiana (Barrett, 1882)
Choristoneura diversana (Hübner, 1817)
Choristoneura hebenstreitella (Muller, 1764)
Choristoneura murinana (Hübner, 1799)
Clepsis consimilana (Hübner, 1817)
Clepsis pallidana (Fabricius, 1776)
Clepsis rogana (Guenee, 1845)
Clepsis rurinana (Linnaeus, 1758)
Clepsis senecionana (Hübner, 1819)
Clepsis spectrana (Treitschke, 1830)
Clepsis steineriana (Hübner, 1799)
Cnephasia alticolana (Herrich-Schäffer, 1851)
Cnephasia asseclana (Denis & Schiffermüller, 1775)
Cnephasia chrysantheana (Duponchel, 1843)
Cnephasia communana (Herrich-Schäffer, 1851)
Cnephasia ecullyana Real, 1951
Cnephasia genitalana Pierce & Metcalfe, 1922
Cnephasia longana (Haworth, 1811)
Cnephasia oxyacanthana (Herrich-Schäffer, 1851)
Cnephasia pasiuana (Hübner, 1799)
Cnephasia pumicana (Zeller, 1847)
Cnephasia stephensiana (Doubleday, 1849)
Cnephasia incertana (Treitschke, 1835)
Cochylidia heydeniana (Herrich-Schäffer, 1851)
Cochylidia implicitana (Wocke, 1856)
Cochylidia moguntiana (Rossler, 1864)
Cochylidia rupicola (Curtis, 1834)
Cochylidia subroseana (Haworth, 1811)
Cochylimorpha alternana (Stephens, 1834)
Cochylimorpha elongana (Fischer v. Röslerstamm, 1839)
Cochylimorpha hilarana (Herrich-Schäffer, 1851)
Cochylimorpha straminea (Haworth, 1811)
Cochylimorpha woliniana (Schleich, 1868)
Cochylis atricapitana (Stephens, 1852)
Cochylis dubitana (Hübner, 1799)
Cochylis epilinana Duponchel, 1842
Cochylis flaviciliana (Westwood, 1854)
Cochylis hybridella (Hübner, 1813)
Cochylis nana (Haworth, 1811)
Cochylis pallidana Zeller, 1847
Cochylis posterana Zeller, 1847
Cochylis roseana (Haworth, 1811)
Corticivora piniana (Herrich-Schäffer, 1851)
Crocidosema plebejana Zeller, 1847
Cydia amplana (Hübner, 1800)
Cydia cognatana (Barrett, 1874)
Cydia conicolana (Heylaerts, 1874)
Cydia coniferana (Saxesen, 1840)
Cydia corollana (Hübner, 1823)
Cydia cosmophorana (Treitschke, 1835)
Cydia duplicana (Zetterstedt, 1839)
Cydia fagiglandana (Zeller, 1841)
Cydia grunertiana (Ratzeburg, 1868)
Cydia ilipulana (Walsingham, 1903)
Cydia illutana (Herrich-Schäffer, 1851)
Cydia indivisa (Danilevsky, 1963)
Cydia inquinatana (Hübner, 1800)
Cydia intexta (Kuznetsov, 1962)
Cydia leguminana (Lienig & Zeller, 1846)
Cydia medicaginis (Kuznetsov, 1962)
Cydia microgrammana (Guenee, 1845)
Cydia millenniana (Adamczewski, 1967)
Cydia nigricana (Fabricius, 1794)
Cydia oxytropidis (Martini, 1912)
Cydia pactolana (Zeller, 1840)
Cydia pomonella (Linnaeus, 1758)
Cydia pyrivora (Danilevsky, 1947)
Cydia servillana (Duponchel, 1836)
Cydia splendana (Hübner, 1799)
Cydia strobilella (Linnaeus, 1758)
Cydia succedana (Denis & Schiffermüller, 1775)
Cydia zebeana (Ratzeburg, 1840)
Cymolomia hartigiana (Saxesen, 1840)
Dichelia histrionana (Frolich, 1828)
Dichrorampha acuminatana (Lienig & Zeller, 1846)
Dichrorampha aeratana (Pierce & Metcalfe, 1915)
Dichrorampha agilana (Tengstrom, 1848)
Dichrorampha alpinana (Treitschke, 1830)
Dichrorampha cacaleana (Herrich-Schäffer, 1851)
Dichrorampha cinerascens (Danilevsky, 1948)
Dichrorampha consortana Stephens, 1852
Dichrorampha flavidorsana Knaggs, 1867
Dichrorampha gruneriana (Herrich-Schäffer, 1851)
Dichrorampha heegerana (Duponchel, 1843)
Dichrorampha incognitana (Kremky & Maslowski, 1933)
Dichrorampha incursana (Herrich-Schäffer, 1851)
Dichrorampha obscuratana (Wolff, 1955)
Dichrorampha petiverella (Linnaeus, 1758)
Dichrorampha plumbagana (Treitschke, 1830)
Dichrorampha plumbana (Scopoli, 1763)
Dichrorampha podoliensis (Toll, 1942)
Dichrorampha sedatana Busck, 1906
Dichrorampha sequana (Hübner, 1799)
Dichrorampha simpliciana (Haworth, 1811)
Dichrorampha sylvicolana Heinemann, 1863
Dichrorampha vancouverana McDunnough, 1935
Doloploca punctulana (Denis & Schiffermüller, 1775)
Eana derivana (de La Harpe, 1858)
Eana incanana (Stephens, 1852)
Eana penziana (Thunberg, 1791)
Eana argentana (Clerck, 1759)
Eana osseana (Scopoli, 1763)
Eana canescana (Guenee, 1845)
Enarmonia formosana (Scopoli, 1763)
Endothenia ericetana (Humphreys & Westwood, 1845)
Endothenia gentianaeana (Hübner, 1799)
Endothenia lapideana (Herrich-Schäffer, 1851)
Endothenia marginana (Haworth, 1811)
Endothenia nigricostana (Haworth, 1811)
Endothenia oblongana (Haworth, 1811)
Endothenia quadrimaculana (Haworth, 1811)
Endothenia ustulana (Haworth, 1811)
Epagoge grotiana (Fabricius, 1781)
Epibactra immundana (Eversmann, 1844)
Epiblema cirsiana (Zeller, 1843)
Epiblema cnicicolana (Zeller, 1847)
Epiblema costipunctana (Haworth, 1811)
Epiblema foenella (Linnaeus, 1758)
Epiblema grandaevana (Lienig & Zeller, 1846)
Epiblema graphana (Treitschke, 1835)
Epiblema hepaticana (Treitschke, 1835)
Epiblema inulivora (Meyrick, 1932)
Epiblema junctana (Herrich-Schäffer, 1856)
Epiblema sarmatana (Christoph, 1872)
Epiblema scutulana (Denis & Schiffermüller, 1775)
Epiblema similana (Denis & Schiffermüller, 1775)
Epiblema sticticana (Fabricius, 1794)
Epiblema turbidana (Treitschke, 1835)
Epinotia abbreviana (Fabricius, 1794)
Epinotia bilunana (Haworth, 1811)
Epinotia brunnichana (Linnaeus, 1767)
Epinotia caprana (Fabricius, 1798)
Epinotia crenana (Hübner, 1799)
Epinotia cruciana (Linnaeus, 1761)
Epinotia demarniana (Fischer v. Röslerstamm, 1840)
Epinotia festivana (Hübner, 1799)
Epinotia fraternana (Haworth, 1811)
Epinotia gimmerthaliana (Lienig & Zeller, 1846)
Epinotia granitana (Herrich-Schäffer, 1851)
Epinotia immundana (Fischer v. Röslerstamm, 1839)
Epinotia kochiana (Herrich-Schäffer, 1851)
Epinotia maculana (Fabricius, 1775)
Epinotia nanana (Treitschke, 1835)
Epinotia nemorivaga (Tengstrom, 1848)
Epinotia nigricana (Herrich-Schäffer, 1851)
Epinotia nisella (Clerck, 1759)
Epinotia pusillana (Peyerimhoff, 1863)
Epinotia pygmaeana (Hübner, 1799)
Epinotia ramella (Linnaeus, 1758)
Epinotia rubiginosana (Herrich-Schäffer, 1851)
Epinotia signatana (Douglas, 1845)
Epinotia slovacica Patocka & Jaros, 1991
Epinotia solandriana (Linnaeus, 1758)
Epinotia sordidana (Hübner, 1824)
Epinotia subocellana (Donovan, 1806)
Epinotia subsequana (Haworth, 1811)
Epinotia tedella (Clerck, 1759)
Epinotia tenerana (Denis & Schiffermüller, 1775)
Epinotia tetraquetrana (Haworth, 1811)
Epinotia trigonella (Linnaeus, 1758)
Eriopsela quadrana (Hübner, 1813)
Eucosma aemulana (Schlager, 1849)
Eucosma albidulana (Herrich-Schäffer, 1851)
Eucosma aspidiscana (Hübner, 1817)
Eucosma balatonana (Osthelder, 1937)
Eucosma campoliliana (Denis & Schiffermüller, 1775)
Eucosma cana (Haworth, 1811)
Eucosma conterminana (Guenee, 1845)
Eucosma cumulana (Guenee, 1845)
Eucosma fervidana (Zeller, 1847)
Eucosma hohenwartiana (Denis & Schiffermüller, 1775)
Eucosma lacteana (Treitschke, 1835)
Eucosma messingiana (Fischer v. Röslerstamm, 1837)
Eucosma metzneriana (Treitschke, 1830)
Eucosma obumbratana (Lienig & Zeller, 1846)
Eucosma parvulana (Wilkinson, 1859)
Eucosma pupillana (Clerck, 1759)
Eucosma scorzonerana (Benander, 1942)
Eucosma tundrana (Kennel, 1900)
Eucosma wimmerana (Treitschke, 1835)
Eucosmomorpha albersana (Hübner, 1813)
Eudemis porphyrana (Hübner, 1799)
Eudemis profundana (Denis & Schiffermüller, 1775)
Eugnosta parreyssiana (Duponchel, 1843)
Eulia ministrana (Linnaeus, 1758)
Eupoecilia ambiguella (Hübner, 1796)
Eupoecilia angustana (Hübner, 1799)
Eupoecilia sanguisorbana (Herrich-Schäffer, 1856)
Exapate congelatella (Clerck, 1759)
Falseuncaria ruficiliana (Haworth, 1811)
Fulvoclysia nerminae Kocak, 1982
Gibberifera simplana (Fischer v. Röslerstamm, 1836)
Grapholita funebrana Treitschke, 1835
Grapholita janthinana (Duponchel, 1843)
Grapholita lobarzewskii (Nowicki, 1860)
Grapholita molesta (Busck, 1916)
Grapholita tenebrosana Duponchel, 1843
Grapholita caecana Schlager, 1847
Grapholita compositella (Fabricius, 1775)
Grapholita coronillana Lienig & Zeller, 1846
Grapholita delineana Walker, 1863
Grapholita discretana Wocke, 1861
Grapholita fissana (Frolich, 1828)
Grapholita gemmiferana Treitschke, 1835
Grapholita jungiella (Clerck, 1759)
Grapholita larseni Rebel, 1903
Grapholita lathyrana (Hübner, 1822)
Grapholita lunulana (Denis & Schiffermüller, 1775)
Grapholita nebritana Treitschke, 1830
Grapholita orobana Treitschke, 1830
Grapholita pallifrontana Lienig & Zeller, 1846
Gravitarmata margarotana (Heinemann, 1863)
Gynnidomorpha alismana (Ragonot, 1883)
Gynnidomorpha permixtana (Denis & Schiffermüller, 1775)
Gynnidomorpha vectisana (Humphreys & Westwood, 1845)
Gypsonoma aceriana (Duponchel, 1843)
Gypsonoma dealbana (Frolich, 1828)
Gypsonoma minutana (Hübner, 1799)
Gypsonoma nitidulana (Lienig & Zeller, 1846)
Gypsonoma oppressana (Treitschke, 1835)
Gypsonoma sociana (Haworth, 1811)
Hedya dimidiana (Clerck, 1759)
Hedya nubiferana (Haworth, 1811)
Hedya ochroleucana (Frolich, 1828)
Hedya pruniana (Hübner, 1799)
Hedya salicella (Linnaeus, 1758)
Hysterophora maculosana (Haworth, 1811)
Isotrias hybridana (Hübner, 1817)
Isotrias rectifasciana (Haworth, 1811)
Lathronympha strigana (Fabricius, 1775)
Lepteucosma huebneriana Kocak, 1980
Lobesia abscisana (Doubleday, 1849)
Lobesia artemisiana (Zeller, 1847)
Lobesia bicinctana (Duponchel, 1844)
Lobesia botrana (Denis & Schiffermüller, 1775)
Lobesia reliquana (Hübner, 1825)
Lobesia virulenta Bae & Komai, 1991
Lobesia euphorbiana (Freyer, 1842)
Lozotaenia forsterana (Fabricius, 1781)
Metendothenia atropunctana (Zetterstedt, 1839)
Neosphaleroptera nubilana (Hübner, 1799)
Notocelia cynosbatella (Linnaeus, 1758)
Notocelia incarnatana (Hübner, 1800)
Notocelia roborana (Denis & Schiffermüller, 1775)
Notocelia rosaecolana (Doubleday, 1850)
Notocelia tetragonana (Stephens, 1834)
Notocelia trimaculana (Haworth, 1811)
Notocelia uddmanniana (Linnaeus, 1758)
Olethreutes arcuella (Clerck, 1759)
Olindia schumacherana (Fabricius, 1787)
Orthotaenia undulana (Denis & Schiffermüller, 1775)
Pammene agnotana Rebel, 1914
Pammene albuginana (Guenee, 1845)
Pammene amygdalana (Duponchel, 1842)
Pammene argyrana (Hübner, 1799)
Pammene aurana (Fabricius, 1775)
Pammene aurita Razowski, 1991
Pammene christophana (Moschler, 1862)
Pammene fasciana (Linnaeus, 1761)
Pammene gallicana (Guenee, 1845)
Pammene gallicolana (Lienig & Zeller, 1846)
Pammene germmana (Hübner, 1799)
Pammene giganteana (Peyerimhoff, 1863)
Pammene herrichiana (Heinemann, 1854)
Pammene ignorata Kuznetsov, 1968
Pammene insulana (Guenee, 1845)
Pammene luedersiana (Sorhagen, 1885)
Pammene obscurana (Stephens, 1834)
Pammene ochsenheimeriana (Lienig & Zeller, 1846)
Pammene populana (Fabricius, 1787)
Pammene querceti (Gozmany, 1957)
Pammene regiana (Zeller, 1849)
Pammene rhediella (Clerck, 1759)
Pammene spiniana (Duponchel, 1843)
Pammene splendidulana (Guenee, 1845)
Pammene suspectana (Lienig & Zeller, 1846)
Pammene trauniana (Denis & Schiffermüller, 1775)
Pandemis cerasana (Hübner, 1786)
Pandemis cinnamomeana (Treitschke, 1830)
Pandemis corylana (Fabricius, 1794)
Pandemis dumetana (Treitschke, 1835)
Pandemis heparana (Denis & Schiffermüller, 1775)
Paramesia gnomana (Clerck, 1759)
Pelochrista caecimaculana (Hübner, 1799)
Pelochrista hepatariana (Herrich-Schäffer, 1851)
Pelochrista huebneriana (Lienig & Zeller, 1846)
Pelochrista infidana (Hübner, 1824)
Pelochrista mollitana (Zeller, 1847)
Pelochrista obscura Kuznetsov, 1978
Pelochrista subtiliana (Jackh, 1960)
Periclepsis cinctana (Denis & Schiffermüller, 1775)
Phalonidia affinitana (Douglas, 1846)
Phalonidia contractana (Zeller, 1847)
Phalonidia curvistrigana (Stainton, 1859)
Phalonidia gilvicomana (Zeller, 1847)
Phalonidia manniana (Fischer v. Röslerstamm, 1839)
Phaneta pauperana (Duponchel, 1843)
Phiaris bipunctana (Fabricius, 1794)
Phiaris dissolutana (Stange, 1866)
Phiaris micana (Denis & Schiffermüller, 1775)
Phiaris obsoletana (Zetterstedt, 1839)
Phiaris palustrana (Lienig & Zeller, 1846)
Phiaris schulziana (Fabricius, 1776)
Phiaris stibiana (Guenee, 1845)
Phiaris turfosana (Herrich-Schäffer, 1851)
Phiaris umbrosana (Freyer, 1842)
Philedone gerningana (Denis & Schiffermüller, 1775)
Philedonides lunana (Thunberg, 1784)
Philedonides rhombicana (Herrich-Schäffer, 1851)
Phtheochroa annae Huemer, 1990
Phtheochroa inopiana (Haworth, 1811)
Phtheochroa pulvillana Herrich-Schäffer, 1851
Phtheochroa rugosana (Hübner, 1799)
Phtheochroa schreibersiana (Frolich, 1828)
Phtheochroa sodaliana (Haworth, 1811)
Piniphila bifasciana (Haworth, 1811)
Pristerognatha fuligana (Denis & Schiffermüller, 1775)
Pristerognatha penthinana (Guenee, 1845)
Prochlidonia amiantana (Hübner, 1799)
Pseudargyrotoza conwagana (Fabricius, 1775)
Pseudeulia asinana (Hübner, 1799)
Pseudococcyx mughiana (Zeller, 1868)
Pseudococcyx posticana (Zetterstedt, 1839)
Pseudococcyx turionella (Linnaeus, 1758)
Pseudohermenias abietana (Fabricius, 1787)
Pseudosciaphila branderiana (Linnaeus, 1758)
Ptycholoma lecheana (Linnaeus, 1758)
Ptycholomoides aeriferana (Herrich-Schäffer, 1851)
Retinia perangustana (Snellen, 1883)
Retinia resinella (Linnaeus, 1758)
Rhopobota myrtillana (Humphreys & Westwood, 1845)
Rhopobota naevana (Hübner, 1817)
Rhopobota stagnana (Denis & Schiffermüller, 1775)
Rhopobota ustomaculana (Curtis, 1831)
Rhyacionia buoliana (Denis & Schiffermüller, 1775)
Rhyacionia duplana (Hübner, 1813)
Rhyacionia hafneri (Rebel, 1937)
Rhyacionia pinicolana (Doubleday, 1849)
Rhyacionia pinivorana (Lienig & Zeller, 1846)
Selenodes karelica (Tengstrom, 1875)
Sparganothis pilleriana (Denis & Schiffermüller, 1775)
Sparganothis rubicundana (Herrich-Schäffer, 1856)
Spatalistis bifasciana (Hübner, 1787)
Spilonota laricana (Heinemann, 1863)
Spilonota ocellana (Denis & Schiffermüller, 1775)
Stictea mygindiana (Denis & Schiffermüller, 1775)
Strophedra nitidana (Fabricius, 1794)
Strophedra weirana (Douglas, 1850)
Syndemis musculana (Hübner, 1799)
Thiodia citrana (Hübner, 1799)
Thiodia torridana (Lederer, 1859)
Thiodia trochilana (Frolich, 1828)
Tortricodes alternella (Denis & Schiffermüller, 1775)
Tortrix viridana Linnaeus, 1758
Xerocnephasia rigana (Sodoffsky, 1829)
Zeiraphera griseana (Hübner, 1799)
Zeiraphera isertana (Fabricius, 1794)
Zeiraphera ratzeburgiana (Saxesen, 1840)
Zeiraphera rufimitrana (Herrich-Schäffer, 1851)

Urodidae
Wockia asperipunctella (Bruand, 1851)

Yponomeutidae
Cedestis gysseleniella Zeller, 1839
Cedestis subfasciella (Stephens, 1834)
Euhyponomeuta stannella (Thunberg, 1788)
Kessleria alpicella (Stainton, 1851)
Niphonympha dealbatella (Zeller, 1847)
Ocnerostoma friesei Svensson, 1966
Ocnerostoma piniariella Zeller, 1847
Paraswammerdamia albicapitella (Scharfenberg, 1805)
Paraswammerdamia nebulella (Goeze, 1783)
Pseudoswammerdamia combinella (Hübner, 1786)
Scythropia crataegella (Linnaeus, 1767)
Swammerdamia caesiella (Hübner, 1796)
Swammerdamia compunctella Herrich-Schäffer, 1855
Swammerdamia pyrella (Villers, 1789)
Yponomeuta cagnagella (Hübner, 1813)
Yponomeuta evonymella (Linnaeus, 1758)
Yponomeuta irrorella (Hübner, 1796)
Yponomeuta malinellus Zeller, 1838
Yponomeuta padella (Linnaeus, 1758)
Yponomeuta plumbella (Denis & Schiffermüller, 1775)
Yponomeuta rorrella (Hübner, 1796)
Yponomeuta sedella Treitschke, 1832
Zelleria hepariella Stainton, 1849

Ypsolophidae
Ochsenheimeria taurella (Denis & Schiffermüller, 1775)
Ochsenheimeria urella Fischer von Röslerstamm, 1842
Ochsenheimeria vacculella Fischer von Röslerstamm, 1842
Ypsolopha alpella (Denis & Schiffermüller, 1775)
Ypsolopha asperella (Linnaeus, 1761)
Ypsolopha chazariella (Mann, 1866)
Ypsolopha coriacella (Herrich-Schäffer, 1855)
Ypsolopha dentella (Fabricius, 1775)
Ypsolopha falcella (Denis & Schiffermüller, 1775)
Ypsolopha horridella (Treitschke, 1835)
Ypsolopha lucella (Fabricius, 1775)
Ypsolopha mucronella (Scopoli, 1763)
Ypsolopha nemorella (Linnaeus, 1758)
Ypsolopha parenthesella (Linnaeus, 1761)
Ypsolopha persicella (Fabricius, 1787)
Ypsolopha scabrella (Linnaeus, 1761)
Ypsolopha sequella (Clerck, 1759)
Ypsolopha sylvella (Linnaeus, 1767)
Ypsolopha ustella (Clerck, 1759)
Ypsolopha vittella (Linnaeus, 1758)

Zygaenidae
Adscita geryon (Hübner, 1813)
Adscita statices (Linnaeus, 1758)
Jordanita chloros (Hübner, 1813)
Jordanita globulariae (Hübner, 1793)
Jordanita subsolana (Staudinger, 1862)
Jordanita notata (Zeller, 1847)
Rhagades pruni (Denis & Schiffermüller, 1775)
Zygaena carniolica (Scopoli, 1763)
Zygaena brizae (Esper, 1800)
Zygaena cynarae (Esper, 1789)
Zygaena laeta (Hübner, 1790)
Zygaena minos (Denis & Schiffermüller, 1775)
Zygaena punctum Ochsenheimer, 1808
Zygaena purpuralis (Brunnich, 1763)
Zygaena angelicae Ochsenheimer, 1808
Zygaena ephialtes (Linnaeus, 1767)
Zygaena filipendulae (Linnaeus, 1758)
Zygaena lonicerae (Scheven, 1777)
Zygaena loti (Denis & Schiffermüller, 1775)
Zygaena osterodensis Reiss, 1921
Zygaena trifolii (Esper, 1783)
Zygaena viciae (Denis & Schiffermüller, 1775)

External links
Fauna Europaea

Czech Republic
Czech Republic
Czech, lepidoptera
Lepidoptera